= List of Puccinia species =

Puccinia fungus species

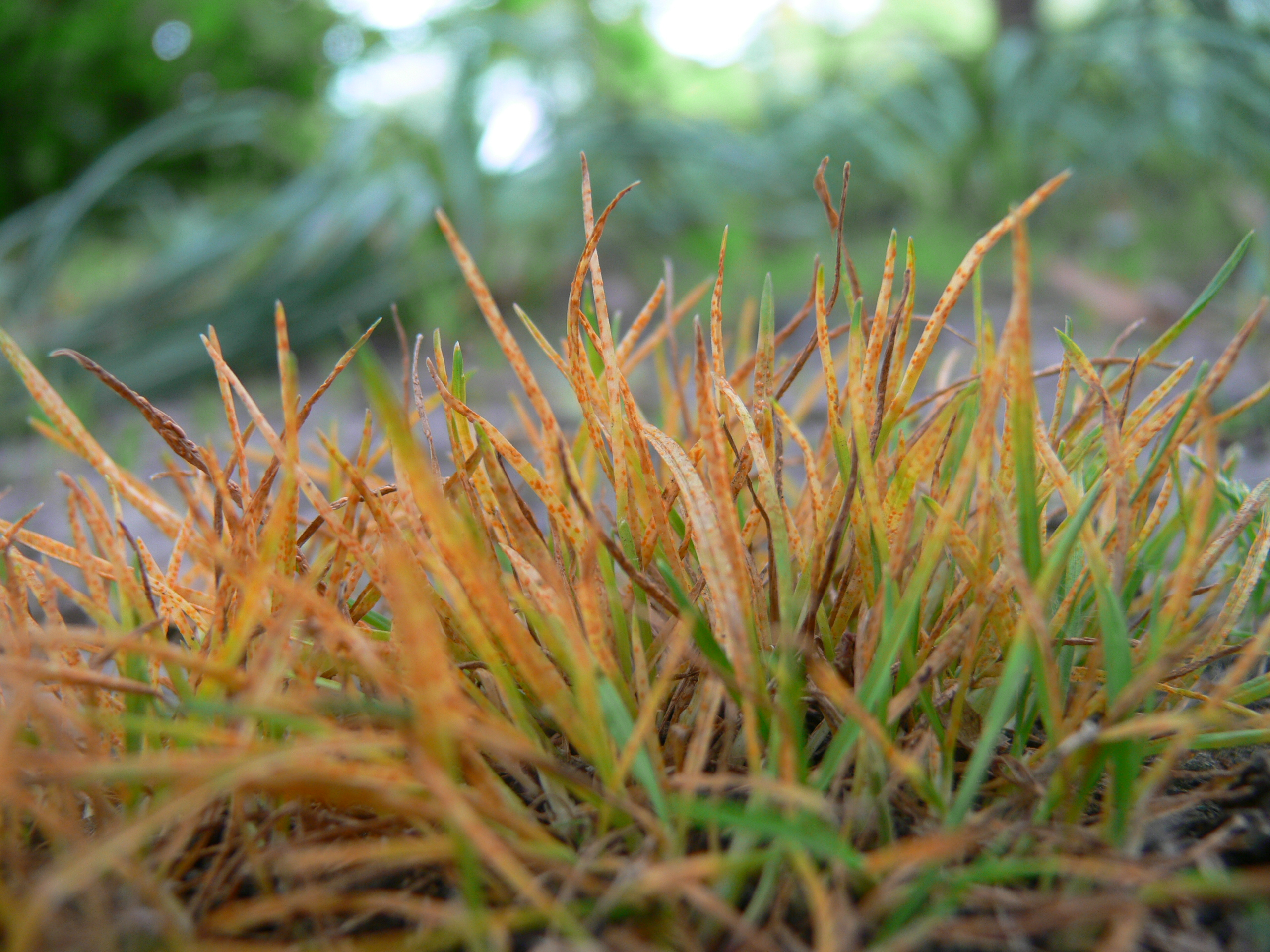
Puccinia poae-nemoralis growing on the grass Poa pratensis

This is a list of the fungus species in the genus Puccinia. Members of this genus are pathogens on all major cereal crop species except rice, and some cause large economic losses. According to the Dictionary of the Fungi (10th edition, 2008), the widespread genus contains about 4000 species. There were an estiamated 3300 species as accepted by Wijayawardene et al. 2020.

As of 2023 August 17, the GBIF lists up to 3,259 species, while Species Fungorum lists about 3251 species (with many former species). The Encyclopedia of Life lists 3,192 species. This list is based on the Species Fungorum list in 2023.

== A ==
- Puccinia abchazica Tranzschel & Erem. (1939)
- Puccinia abei Hirats. f. (1937)
- Puccinia aberrans Peck (1879)
- Puccinia abnormis Henn. (1896)
- Puccinia abramoviana Lavrov (1951)
- Puccinia abramsii Parmelee (1968)
- Puccinia abrepta F. Kern (1919)
- Puccinia abrotani Fahrend. (1941)
- Puccinia abrupta Dietel & Holw. (1898)
- Puccinia absicca H.S. Jacks. & Holw. (1918)
- Puccinia abundans (Peck) H.S. Jacks. (1918)
- Puccinia abutiloides Cummins (1945)
- Puccinia abutilonis Berk. & Broome (1873)
- Puccinia abyssinica (Henn.) P. Syd. & Syd. (1902)
- Puccinia acalyphae Doidge (1927)
- Puccinia acanthospermi Henn. (1902)
- Puccinia acarnae P. Syd. & Syd. (1902)
- Puccinia accedens P. Syd. & Syd. (1902)
- Puccinia acetosae (Schumach.) Körn. (1876)
- Puccinia achilleae Cooke (1880)
- Puccinia achilleicola Petr. (1947)
- Puccinia achnatheri-inebriantis Z.Y. Zhao (1985)
- Puccinia achnatheri-sibirici Y.C. Wang (1965)
- Puccinia achyroclines (Henn.) H.S. Jacks. & Holw. (1932)
- Puccinia acnisti Arthur (1918)
- Puccinia acokantherae Henn. (1895)
- Puccinia aconiti-rubrae Lüdi (1918)
- Puccinia acrophila Peck (1881)
- Puccinia acroptili P. Syd. & Syd. (1902)
- Puccinia actaeae-agropyri E. Fisch. (1901)
- Puccinia actaeae-elymi Mayor (1911)
- Puccinia actinellae (Webber) Syd. & P. Syd. (1902)
- Puccinia actinomeridis Magnus (1901)
- Puccinia actinostemonis H.S. Jacks. & Holw. (1931)
- Puccinia aculeatispora Höhn. (1918)
- Puccinia acuminata Fuckel (1870)
- Puccinia acunae Z. Urb. (1973)
- Puccinia acutiuscula Jørst. (1957)
- Puccinia addita Syd. (1937)
- Puccinia additicia H.S. Jacks. & Holw. (1921)
- Puccinia adducta Arthur (1918)
- Puccinia adenocalymmatis (Henn.) Arthur & J.R. Johnst. (1918)
- Puccinia adenocauli (Syd. & P. Syd.) Jing X. Ji & Kakish. (2017)
- Puccinia adenophorae Dietel (1930)
- Puccinia adenophorae-verticillatae S. Ito & Terui (1930)
- Puccinia adenostegiae Arthur (1902)
- Puccinia adesmiae Henn. (1896)
- Puccinia adjuncta Mitter (1937)
- Puccinia adoxae R. Hedw. (1805)
- Puccinia aduncata F. He & Kakish. (1993)
- Puccinia advena Syd. (1924)
- Puccinia aecidiiformis Thüm. (1875)
- Puccinia aecidii-leucanthemi E. Fisch. (1898)
- Puccinia aegilopis Maire (1914)
- Puccinia aegopodii (Schumach.) Link (1817)
- Puccinia aegopogonis Arthur & Holw. (1918)
- Puccinia aegopordonis P. Syd. & Syd. (1902)
- Puccinia aegroides Cummins (1940)
- Puccinia aeluropodis Ricker (1905)
- Puccinia aenigmatica H.S. Jacks. & Holw. (1932)
- Puccinia aequalis Henn. (1895)
- Puccinia aequatoriensis P. Syd. & Syd. (1902)
- Puccinia aequitatis Cummins (1949)
- Puccinia aestivalis Dietel (1905)
- Puccinia aetheopappi Savile (1970)
- Puccinia aethionematis Koshk. (1961)
- Puccinia aethiopica Kalchbr. & Cooke (1882)
- Puccinia afra G. Winter (1887)
- Puccinia aframomi Hansf. (1949)
- Puccinia aframomi-gigantei J.M. Yen & Gilles (1970)
- Puccinia africana Cooke (1879)
- Puccinia agasyllidis Tranzschel & Erem. (1939)
- Puccinia aggregata Syd. & P. Syd. (1913)
- Puccinia agnesiae Syd. (1934)
- Puccinia agnita Arthur (1915)
- Puccinia agnitionalis H.S. Jacks. & Holw. (1932)
- Puccinia agoseridis Parmelee & Savile (1981)
- Puccinia agrophila Syd. (1937)
- Puccinia agropyri-ciliaris F.L. Tai & C.T. Wei (1933)
- Puccinia agropyricola Hirats. f. (1951)
- Puccinia agropyri-juncei Kleb. (1913)
- Puccinia agrostidicola F.L. Tai (1947)
- Puccinia agrostidis Plowr. (1890)
- Puccinia agrostidis-caninae Afshan, Berndt, Khalid & Niazi (2008)
- Puccinia ahmadiana Syd. (1938)
- Puccinia ainsliaeae P. Syd. & Syd. (1902)
- Puccinia ainsliaeae-acerifoliae Y. Harada (1984)
- Puccinia aizazii B. Ali (2017)
- Puccinia akebiae Y.Z. Wang & S.X. Wei (1980)
- Puccinia akiraho G. Cunn. (1930)
- Puccinia akiyoshidanensis Morim. (1959)
- Puccinia alamedensis J.W. Baxter (1951)
- Puccinia alatavica Nevod. (1950)
- Puccinia albescens (Grev.) Plowr. (1889)
- Puccinia albicera H.S. Jacks. & Holw. (1932)
- Puccinia albida Dietel & Neger (1897)
- Puccinia albiperidia Arthur (1902)
- Puccinia albispora Y. Ono & Kakish. (2001)
- Puccinia alboclava G.T.S. Baylis (1954)
- Puccinia albula H.S. Jacks. & Holw. (1932)
- Puccinia albulensis Magnus (1890)
- Puccinia alcazabae Mayor (1973)
- Puccinia alepideae Doidge (1927)
- Puccinia aletridis Berk. & M.A. Curtis (1874)
- Puccinia algerica Pat. (1905)
- Puccinia alia H.S. Jacks. & Holw. (1932)
- Puccinia alisovae Tranzschel (1939)
- Puccinia allanii G. Cunn. (1923)
- Puccinia allaudabilis H.S. Jacks. & Holw. (1932)
- Puccinia allii-cepulae Mundk. & Thirum. (1946)
- Puccinia allii-japonici Dietel (1902)
- Puccinia allogena Syd. (1939)
- Puccinia alnetorum Gäum. (1941)
- Puccinia alpestris Syd. & P. Syd. (1901)
- Puccinia alpina Fuckel (1874)
- Puccinia alpinae-coronatae Mühleth. (1911)
- Puccinia alsophila Sacc. (1878)
- Puccinia alstroemeriae P. Syd. & Syd. (1903)
- Puccinia altaica P. Syd. & Syd. (1902)
- Puccinia altensis Lindr. (1901)
- Puccinia alternans Arthur (1910)
- Puccinia altimurica Petr. (1968)
- Puccinia altissima Syd. (1939)
- Puccinia altissimorum Savile (1970)
- Puccinia alxaensis T.Z. Liu, X.P. Yang & J.Y. Zhuang (2014)
- Puccinia alyssi Lindr. (1902)
- Puccinia alyxiae Cooke & Massee (1887)
- Puccinia amadelpha Syd. (1924)
- Puccinia amaniensis Henn. (1905)
- Puccinia amari Demers (2017)
- Puccinia ametableta Syd. (1925)
- Puccinia amianthina Syd. & P. Syd. (1910)
- Puccinia amphigena Dietel (1895)
- Puccinia amphilophidis Doidge (1939)
- Puccinia amphiospora (H.S. Jacks. & Holw.) Cummins (1940)
- Puccinia amphispilusa Dietel & Holw. (1895)
- Puccinia amphispora M. Scholler (2015)
- Puccinia amphistelmae Henn. (1908)
- Puccinia amplifica H.S. Jacks. & Holw. (1932)
- Puccinia amygdali-iridis P. Zhao & L. Cai (2021)
- Puccinia anaphalidis-virgatae Khalid, Afshan & S.H. Iqbal (2010)
- Puccinia anceps Speg. (1925)
- Puccinia ancizari Mayor (1914)
- Puccinia andalgalensis J.C. Lindq. (1955)
- Puccinia andina Dietel & Neger (1899)
- Puccinia andropogonicola Har. & Pat. (1909)
- Puccinia andropogonis Schwein. (1832)
- Puccinia andropogonis-macranthi Dietel (1909)
- Puccinia andryalae (Syd. & P. Syd.) Maire (1917)
- Puccinia anemones-raddeanae S. Ito (1913)
- Puccinia anemones-virginianae Schwein. (1822)
- Puccinia angelicae-edulis T. Miyake (1906)
- Puccinia angelicae-mammillata Kleb. (1904)
- Puccinia angelicicola Henn. (1903)
- Puccinia angivyi Bouriquet & Bassino (1966)
- Puccinia angulata Dietel & Neger (1897)
- Puccinia angulosi-phalaridis Poeverl. (1924)
- Puccinia anguriae Arthur & Cummins (1933)
- Puccinia angusii Cummins (1965)
- Puccinia angustata Peck (1873)
- Puccinia angustatoides R. Stone (1909)
- Puccinia angustifoliae McAlpine (1906)
- Puccinia anhweiana Cummins (1951)
- Puccinia anisacanthi Dietel & Holw. (1901)
- Puccinia anisotomes G. Cunn. (1924)
- Puccinia ankarensis Bermer & Petr. (1947)
- Puccinia annapurnae Durrieu (1979)
- Puccinia annularis (F. Strauss) G. Winter (1881)
- Puccinia annulatipes Cummins (1974)
- Puccinia anodae P. Syd. & Syd. (1903)
- Puccinia ansata Lindr. (1902)
- Puccinia antennata Berndt & Rössel (2007)
- Puccinia antenori J.Y. Zhuang & Y.C. Wang (1985)
- Puccinia antensis J.C. Lindq. (1960)
- Puccinia anthemidis P. Syd. & Syd. (1902)
- Puccinia anthephorae (Syd. & P. Syd.) Arthur & J.R. Johnst. (1918)
- Puccinia anthospermi P. Syd. & Syd. (1902)
- Puccinia anthriscicola Gjaerum (1985)
- Puccinia antioquiensis Mayor (1914)
- Puccinia antirrhini Dietel & Holw. (1897)
- Puccinia antoniana Unamuno (1930)
- Puccinia antucensis Syd. (1928)
- Puccinia aomoriensis Syd. & P. Syd. (1913)
- Puccinia aorangi G. Cunn. (1930)
- Puccinia aphananthes-asperae P. Zhao & L. Cai (2021)
- Puccinia aphanicondra Lindr. (1902)
- Puccinia apii Desm. (1823)
- Puccinia apludae Syd. & P. Syd. (1906)
- Puccinia apochitonis Gjaerum (1988)
- Puccinia apocrypta Ellis & Tracy (1890)
- Puccinia apocyni Dietel & Holw. (1897)
- Puccinia apus Dietel & Neger (1897)
- Puccinia arabidicola Ellis & Everh. (1891)
- Puccinia arabidis D.M. Hend. (1959)
- Puccinia arabidis-conringioidis Maire (1937)
- Puccinia arachidis Speg. (1884)
- Puccinia araguata F. Kern (1938)
- Puccinia araliae Ellis & Everh. (1891)
- Puccinia araliae-cordatae Henn. (1904)
- Puccinia araucana Dietel & Neger (1897)
- Puccinia arbor-miraculensis Berndt (2007)
- Puccinia archangelicae A. Blytt (1896)
- Puccinia archibaccharidis J.F. Hennen, León-Gall. & Cummins (1972)
- Puccinia arctica Lagerh. (1902)
- Puccinia arcythophylli Syd. (1939)
- Puccinia ardahanensis Berndt, Bahç. & Kabakt. (2009)
- Puccinia arechavaletae Speg. (1881)
- Puccinia arenariae (Schumach.) J. Schröt. (1880)
- Puccinia arenariae-griffithii Kuprev. (1950)
- Puccinia areolata Dietel & Holw. (1894)
- Puccinia argentata (Schultz) G. Winter (1880)
- Puccinia argophyllae Teakle (1959)
- Puccinia aridariae Mennicken, W. Maier, Crous & Oberw. (2005)
- Puccinia ariorum M. Abbasi, Hedjar., Gjaerum & M. Scholler (2002)
- Puccinia aristidae Tracy (1893)
- Puccinia aristidicola Henn. (1896)
- Puccinia aristolochiae (DC.) G. Winter (1881)
- Puccinia armeniaca Teterevn.-Babajan (1948)
- Puccinia arnaudensis G. Cunn. (1928)
- Puccinia arnaudii Har. & Dietel (1913)
- Puccinia arnicae-scorpioidis (DC.) Magnus (1893)
- Puccinia arnicalis Peck (1881)
- Puccinia arnoseridis Sousa da Câmara (1949)
- Puccinia aromatica Bubák (1902)
- Puccinia arracachae Lagerh. & Lindr. (1901)
- Puccinia arracacharum (Lindr.) Arthur (1918)
- Puccinia arrhenathericola E. Fisch. (1920)
- Puccinia artemisiae-afrae Gjaerum (1986)
- Puccinia artemisiae-arenariae Const. (1916)
- Puccinia artemisiae-camphoratae A.L. Guyot (1951)
- Puccinia artemisiae-chamaemelifoliae Aliabadi & M. Abbasi (2013)
- Puccinia artemisiae-hookerianae Dietel (1941)
- Puccinia artemisiae-keiskeanae Miura (1913)
- Puccinia artemisiae-maritimae Fahrend. (1941)
- Puccinia artemisiae-norvegicae Tranzschel & Woron. (1914)
- Puccinia artemisiae-sibiricae Jørst. (1959)
- Puccinia artemisiicola P. Syd. & Syd. (1902)
- Puccinia arthraxonicola Z.M. Cao & J.Y. Zhuang (2000)
- Puccinia arthraxonis-ciliaris Cummins (1953)
- Puccinia arthrocnemi Hansf. (1954)
- Puccinia arthurella Sacc. & Trotter (1925)
- Puccinia arthurii P. Syd. & Syd. (1904)
- Puccinia arundinellae Barclay (1889)
- Puccinia arundinellae-anomalae Dietel (1905)
- Puccinia arundinellae-setosae F.L. Tai (1947)
- Puccinia arundinis-donacis T. Hirats. (1958)
- Puccinia arvernensis Liou (1929)
- Puccinia asaricola F.L. Tai & C.C. Cheo (1937)
- Puccinia asarina Kunze (1817)
- Puccinia aschersoniana Henn. (1893)
- Puccinia asiatica (Kom.) P. Syd. & Syd. (1903)
- Puccinia asparagi DC. (1805)
- Puccinia asparagi-lucidi Dietel (1903)
- Puccinia asperior Ellis & Everh. (1884)
- Puccinia asperulae Fuckel (1870)
- Puccinia asperulae-aparinis Picb. (1927)
- Puccinia asperulae-cynanchicae Wurth (1904)
- Puccinia asperulae-luteae Gäum. (1938)
- Puccinia asphodeli (DC.) Duby (1830)
- Puccinia aspiliae Dietel (1897)
- Puccinia aspiliae-latifoliae Cummins (1941)
- Puccinia asprellae-japonicae Hara (1943)
- Puccinia asteris-alpini P. Syd. & Syd. (1902)
- Puccinia asterum (Schwein.) F. Kern (1917)
- Puccinia astrantiae Kalchbr. (1865)
- Puccinia astrantiae-vivipari Semadeni (1906)
- Puccinia astrantiicola Bubák (1900)
- Puccinia astricta H.S. Jacks. & Holw. (1932)
- Puccinia asyneumatis Bahç. & Kabakt. (2005)
- Puccinia asystasiae E. Castell. (1947)
- Puccinia ateridoi Unamuno (1941)
- Puccinia athamantina P. Syd. & Syd. (1901)
- Puccinia atkinsonii G. Cunn. (1923)
- Puccinia atlantica Maire (1915)
- Puccinia atra Dietel & Holw. (1897)
- Puccinia atractylidis P. Syd. & Syd. (1902)
- Puccinia atragenes W. Hausm. (1861)
- Puccinia atragenicola (Bubák) P. Syd. & Syd. (1903)
- Puccinia atrofusca (Dudley & C.H. Thomps.) Holw. (1904)
- Puccinia atropuncta Peck & Clinton (1879)
- Puccinia aucta Berk. & F. Muell. (1872)
- Puccinia aulacospermi Gamalizk. (1958)
- Puccinia aulica H.S. Jacks. & Holw. (1932)
- Puccinia aurata Syd. & P. Syd. (1904)
- Puccinia aureocrassa Gjaerum (1988)
- Puccinia australis Körn. (1873)
- Puccinia austrina McKenzie (2008)
- Puccinia austroafricana (Doidge) Berndt (2009)
- Puccinia austroberingiana (Savile) Savile (1974)
- Puccinia austrosinensis J.Y. Zhuang & S.X. Wei (2011)
- Puccinia austroussuriensis Tranzschel (1939)
- Puccinia austroyunnanica J.Y. Zhuang & S.X. Wei (2001)
- Puccinia avenae-barbatae Gonz. Frag. (1924)
- Puccinia avenae-pubescentis Bubák (1906)
- Puccinia avenastri A.L. Guyot (1951)
- Puccinia avocensis Cummins & H.C. Greene (1954)
- Puccinia axiniphylli Arthur (1905)
- Puccinia azanzae Yadav (1963)
- Puccinia azerbaijanica Tranzschel & Erem. (1939)
- Puccinia azrouana Guyot & Malençon (1963)
- Puccinia azteca Cummins & J.F. Hennen (1971)

== B ==
- Puccinia babbagiae Petr. (1957)
- Puccinia baccharidicola Henn. (1896)
- Puccinia baccharidis Dietel & Holw. (1893)
- Puccinia baccharidis-antioquensis Vanegas-Berrouet & Salazar-Yepes (2019)
- Puccinia baccharidis-boliviensis Berndt (2002)
- Puccinia baccharidis-cassinoidis Henn. (1896)
- Puccinia baccharidis-cylindricae Henn. (1896)
- Puccinia baccharidis-hirtellae Dietel & Holw. (1901)
- Puccinia baccharidis-multiflorae Dietel & Holw. (1901)
- Puccinia baccharidis-petiolatae J.C. Lindq. (1958)
- Puccinia baccharidis-polifoliae J.C. Lindq. (1958)
- Puccinia baccharidis-rhexioidis Mayor (1914)
- Puccinia baccharidis-sparteae H.S. Jacks. & Holw. (1932)
- Puccinia baccharidis-triplinervis Henn. (1896)
- Puccinia badia Holw. (1905)
- Puccinia baeumleriana Bubák (1908)
- Puccinia bagyanarayanae Sham. Kumar, R. Singh & D.K. Gond (2017)
- Puccinia baicalensis Tranzschel (1933)
- Puccinia bakeriana Arthur (1904)
- Puccinia bakoyana Pat. & Har. (1900)
- Puccinia balansae Speg. (1884)
- Puccinia baldensis Gäum. (1951)
- Puccinia baldshuanica K Korbonsk. (1951)
- Puccinia ballotae D.M. Hend. (1959)
- Puccinia ballotiflora Long (1902)
- Puccinia balsamorhizae Peck (1884)
- Puccinia bambusarum (Henn.) Arthur (1918)
- Puccinia bambusicola S.X. Wei & J.Y. Zhuang (1990)
- Puccinia band-i-amirii Durrieu (1975)
- Puccinia banisteriae Henn. (1895)
- Puccinia baradensis P.B. Chavan & U.V. Kulk. (1975)
- Puccinia barbacenensis Rangel (1917)
- Puccinia barbara (Speg.) Speg. (1922)
- Puccinia barbatula Arthur & J.R. Johnst. (1918)
- Puccinia barbeyi (Roum.) Magnus (1883)
- Puccinia barclayi S. Ahmad (1956)
- Puccinia barkhausiae-rhoeadifoliae Bubák (1902)
- Puccinia barranquillae Mayor (1914)
- Puccinia barretoi A.A. Carvalho & J.F. Hennen (2019)
- Puccinia barri-aranae Dietel & Neger (1899)
- Puccinia barroeteae P. Syd. & Syd. (1902)
- Puccinia bartholomaei Dietel (1892)
- Puccinia baschmica Petr. (1940)
- Puccinia basiporula H.S. Jacks. & Holw. (1918)
- Puccinia basirostrata Berndt (1998)
- Puccinia bassiae Samuel (1924)
- Puccinia batatas P. Syd. & Syd. (1902)
- Puccinia batesiana Arthur (1901)
- Puccinia baudysii Picb. (1926)
- Puccinia becii Doidge (1927)
- Puccinia beckii Mayor (1914)
- Puccinia beckmanniae McAlpine (1906)
- Puccinia behboudii Esfand. (1951)
- Puccinia behenis G.H. Otth (1871)
- Puccinia belamcandae Dietel (1907)
- Puccinia belizensis Mains (1939)
- Puccinia bella J.F. Hennen & Cummins (1973)
- Puccinia bellidiastri (Unger) G. Winter (1881)
- Puccinia bellurensis Thirum. (1945)
- Puccinia beltranii Gonz. Frag. (1914)
- Puccinia benedicti P. Syd. & Syd. (1902)
- Puccinia bengalensis Cummins (1965)
- Puccinia benguetensis Syd. & P. Syd. (1917)
- Puccinia benkei Kusano (1904)
- Puccinia benokijamensis Hirats. f. (1941)
- Puccinia berberidis-darwinii H.S. Jacks. & Holw. (1931)
- Puccinia berberidis-trifoliae Dietel & Holw. (1901)
- Puccinia berkeleyana De Toni (1888)
- Puccinia berkheyae Wakef. (1917)
- Puccinia berkheyaephila Berndt & A.R. Wood (2010)
- Puccinia berkheyicola Doidge (1927)
- Puccinia beschiana Maire (1903)
- Puccinia bessei Cruchet (1909)
- Puccinia betae-bengalensis Mundk. & Thirum. (1951)
- Puccinia betonicae (Alb. & Schwein.) DC. (1815)
- Puccinia bewsiae Cummins (1956)
- Puccinia bhutanensis Savile (1968)
- Puccinia bicolor Ellis & Everh. (1900)
- Puccinia biformis Lagerh. (1890)
- Puccinia bimbergii Mayor (1914)
- Puccinia bipolaris A.A. Carvalho & J.F. Hennen (2012)
- Puccinia biporosa J.Y. Zhuang (1988)
- Puccinia biporospora M. Scholler (2015)
- Puccinia biporula J.W. Baxter (1952)
- Puccinia biscutellae Gonz. Frag. (1924)
- Puccinia bistortae (F. Strauss) DC. (1815)
- Puccinia biteliana Savchenko, V.P. Heluta, Wasser & Nevo (2014)
- Puccinia bithynica Magnus (1902)
- Puccinia blechi Lagerh. (1895)
- Puccinia blepharidis Henn. (1903)
- Puccinia blyttiana Lagerh. (1892)
- Puccinia boehmeriae Henn. (1895)
- Puccinia boerhaviifoliae Thirum. (1945)
- Puccinia bogotensis Mayor (1914)
- Puccinia boisduvaliae Peck (1882)
- Puccinia bokensis Henn. (1907)
- Puccinia boliviana H.S. Jacks. & Holw. (1932)
- Puccinia bolleyana Sacc. (1891)
- Puccinia bomani Vestergr. (1909)
- Puccinia bomareae Henn. (1896)
- Puccinia bombacis vDietel (1899)
- Puccinia bonanniae P. Syd. & Syd. (1902)
- Puccinia bonariensis Speg. (1880)
- Puccinia boopidis Neger (1896)
- Puccinia boreo-occidentalis J.Y. Zhuang & S.X. Wei (2001)
- Puccinia bornmuelleri Magnus (1899)
- Puccinia boroniae Henn. (1903)
- Puccinia borreriae P. Syd. & Syd. (1902)
- Puccinia bottomleyae Doidge (1939)
- Puccinia bougainvilleae (Speg.) J. Schröt. (1896)
- Puccinia bouinanensis A.L. Guyot (1958)
- Puccinia boutelouae (H.S. Jenn.) Holw. (1905)
- Puccinia bouvardiae Griffiths (1902)
- Puccinia brachybotrydis Kom. (1899)
- Puccinia brachycarpa Syd. (1931)
- Puccinia brachycomes McAlpine (1906)
- Puccinia brachycyclica E. Fisch. (1934)
- Puccinia brachypodii G.H. Otth (1861)
- Puccinia brachypodii-phoenicoidis Guyot & Malençon (1963)
- Puccinia brachypus Speg. (1902)
- Puccinia brachysora Dietel (1902)
- Puccinia brachystachyicola I. Hino & Katum. (1960)
- Puccinia brachytela Syd. (1925)
- Puccinia brandegeei Peck (1882)
- Puccinia brevicornis S. Ito (1909)
- Puccinia breviculmis (Henn.) Dietel (1907)
- Puccinia brevispora Racib. (1900)
- Puccinia brickelliae Peck (1885)
- Puccinia brigantiaca R. Heim (1927)
- Puccinia bromicola A.L. Guyot (1941)
- Puccinia bromi-japonici S. Ito (1909)
- Puccinia bromi-maximi A.L. Guyot (1941)
- Puccinia bromina Erikss. (1899)
- Puccinia bromoides A.L. Guyot (1951)
- Puccinia bruchiana J.C. Lindq. (1953)
- Puccinia brunoniae McAlpine (1895)
- Puccinia buchloes Schofield (1902)
- Puccinia buchnerae Cummins (1941)
- Puccinia bufoniae Petr. & I. Lohwag (1974)
- Puccinia buharica Jacz. (1900)
- Puccinia bulbilipes J.F. Hennen & Cummins (1973)
- Puccinia bulbostylidicola Thirum. (1947)
- Puccinia bulbostylidis Doidge (1927)
- Puccinia bullata (Pers.) J. Schröt. (1879)
- Puccinia bupleuri F. Rudolphi (1829)
- Puccinia bupleuri-stellati Gäum. (1939)
- Puccinia buriticae Pardo-Card. (2000)
- Puccinia burmanica Syd., P. Syd. & E.J. Butler (1912)
- Puccinia burmeisteri Speg. (1898)
- Puccinia burnettii Griffiths (1902)
- Puccinia butleri Syd. & P. Syd. (1906)
- Puccinia buxi Sowerby (1815)
- Puccinia byliana Dippen. (1931)

== C ==
- Puccinia cabo-friensis Henn. (1904)
- Puccinia caborcensis Parmelee (1969)
- Puccinia cacabata Arthur & Holw. (1925)
- Puccinia cacao McAlpine (1906)
- Puccinia cacheutensis Speg. (1909)
- Puccinia caeomatiformis Lagerh. (1902)
- Puccinia cagayanensis Syd. (1931)
- Puccinia calanticariae Parmelee (1968)
- Puccinia calchakina Speg. (1925)
- Puccinia calcitrapae DC. (1805)
- Puccinia caldasii Salazar-Yepes & Buriticá (2008)
- Puccinia caleae Arthur (1905)
- Puccinia calida A.A. Carvalho & J.F. Hennen (2012)
- Puccinia californica Dietel & Holw. (1893)
- Puccinia callaquensis Neger (1896)
- Puccinia callianthemi Gäum. (1934)
- Puccinia callistea Syd. & P. Syd. (1909)
- Puccinia callistephi Săvul. (1939)
- Puccinia callosa Jørst. (1956)
- Puccinia calocephali McAlpine (1906)
- Puccinia calochorti Peck (1881)
- Puccinia calogynes Dennis (1950)
- Puccinia calosperma Syd., P. Syd. & E.J. Butler (1906)
- Puccinia calotidis McAlpine (1906)
- Puccinia calthae Link (1825)
- Puccinia calthicola J. Schröt. (1879)
- Puccinia calumnata Syd. & P. Syd. (1913)
- Puccinia calycerae P. Syd. & Syd. (1902)
- Puccinia calycerae-cavanillesii Sacc. & D. Sacc. (1905)
- Puccinia calystegiae-soldanellae Z. Li, F. Nakai & Y. Harada (2004)
- Puccinia camargoi Puttemans (1930)
- Puccinia campanulae Carmich. (1836)
- Puccinia campanulae-herminii Gonz. Frag. (1914)
- Puccinia campanulae-scheuchzeri Gäum. & Jaag (1935)
- Puccinia campulosae Thüm. (1878)
- Puccinia canadensis Arthur (1904)
- Puccinia canaliculata (Schwein.) Lagerh. (1895)
- Puccinia canariensis P. Syd. & Syd. (1902)
- Puccinia cancellata (Durieu & Mont.) Sacc. & Roum. (1881)
- Puccinia cannacearum Bagyan. & P. Ramesh (1999)
- Puccinia cannae (G. Winter) Henn. (1902)
- Puccinia capensis Dietel (1905)
- Puccinia capillaris Gäum. (1939)
- Puccinia capitulata H.S. Jacks. & Holw. (1932)
- Puccinia capsici Mayor (1914)
- Puccinia capsicicola F. Kern & Thurst. (1940)
- Puccinia cara Cummins (1949)
- Puccinia caracasana Syd. (1930)
- Puccinia carbonacea Kalchbr. & Cooke (1882)
- Puccinia cardamines-bellidifoliae Dietel (1899)
- Puccinia cardui-carlinoidis Bremer & Petr. (1947)
- Puccinia carduncelli P. Syd. & Syd. (1902)
- Puccinia carici-adenocauli Kakish., Yokoi & Y. Harada (1999)
- Puccinia caricicola Fuckel (1874)
- Puccinia caricina DC. (1815)
- Puccinia caricis-amblyolepis Homma (1938)
- Puccinia caricis-araliae Kakish. & Q. Wang (2014)
- Puccinia caricis-asterina Y. Harada (1977)
- Puccinia caricis-asteris Arthur (1902)
- Puccinia caricis-atractylodis Jing X. Ji, Zhuang Li, Y. Li, M. Kakishima (2021)
- Puccinia caricis-atropictae Speg. (1909)
- Puccinia caricis-blepharicarpae Hirats. f. (1949)
- Puccinia caricis-bonariensis Speg. (1909)
- Puccinia caricis-boottianae Hirats. f. (1954)
- Puccinia caricis-bracteosae Speg. (1910)
- Puccinia caricis-brunneae Dietel (1906)
- Puccinia caricis-cernuae Doidge (1939)
- Puccinia caricis-circaearum Y. Harada (1977)
- Puccinia caricis-conicae Homma (1938)
- Puccinia caricis-daisenensis Morim. (1974)
- Puccinia caricis-darwinii Speg. (1909)
- Puccinia caricis-diffusa Erikss. (1920)
- Puccinia caricis-dimorpholepis Morim. (1960)
- Puccinia caricis-erigerontis Arthur (1902)
- Puccinia caricis-fediae Y. Harada (1987)
- Puccinia caricis-filicinae Barclay (1889)
- Puccinia caricis-flabellatae Y. Harada (1987)
- Puccinia caricis-frigidae E. Fisch. (1897)
- Puccinia caricis-gayanae Speg. (1909)
- Puccinia caricis-gibbae Dietel (1906)
- Puccinia caricis-grossulariae (Erikss.) Sacc. (1928)
- Puccinia caricis-haematorrhynchae Dietel & Neger (1899)
- Puccinia caricis-hancockianae J.Y. Zhuang & S.X. Wei (1997)
- Puccinia caricis-heterolepis Morim. (1972)
- Puccinia caricis-incisae Syd. & P. Syd. (1913)
- Puccinia caricis-japonicae Dietel (1906)
- Puccinia caricis-kouriyamensis Morim. (1972)
- Puccinia caricis-lanceolatae Morim. (1972)
- Puccinia caricis-lingii J.Y. Zhuang (1988)
- Puccinia caricis-linkii Gonz. Frag. (1914)
- Puccinia caricis-macrocephalae Dietel (1910)
- Puccinia caricis-maximowiczii Homma (1938)
- Puccinia caricis-molliculae Syd. & P. Syd. (1913)
- Puccinia caricis-montanae E. Fisch. (1898)
- Puccinia caricis-nubigenae Padwick & A. Khan (1944)
- Puccinia caricis-okushiriensis Homma (1938)
- Puccinia caricis-petasitidis Y. Harada (1977)
- Puccinia caricis-pilosae Miura (1938)
- Puccinia caricis-pocilliformis Morim. (1974)
- Puccinia caricis-podogynae Y. Harada (1987)
- Puccinia caricis-polystachyae Dietel (1906)
- Puccinia caricis-pseudololiaceae Homma (1938)
- Puccinia caricis-rhizopodae Miura (1938)
- Puccinia caricis-ribis Erikss. (1920)
- Puccinia caricis-sadoensis Homma (1938)
- Puccinia caricis-scabrifoliae Hirats. f. & Yoshin. (1935)
- Puccinia caricis-shepherdiae Davis (1924)
- Puccinia caricis-shimidzensis Homma (1938)
- Puccinia caricis-siderostictae (Henn.) Dietel (1907)
- Puccinia caricis-sikokianae Morim. (1974)
- Puccinia caricis-solidaginis Arthur (1903)
- Puccinia caricis-stipatae Y. Harada (1987)
- Puccinia caricis-strictae Dietel (1889)
- Puccinia caricis-thunbergii Homma (1938)
- Puccinia caricis-trichostylis Dietel (1905)
- Puccinia caricis-urticae Erikss. (1920)
- Puccinia caricola J.Y. Zhuang (1989)
- Puccinia carissae Cooke & Massee (1893)
- Puccinia carissae-edulis Vienn.-Bourg. (1964)
- Puccinia carnegiana Arthur (1915)
- Puccinia carthami Corda (1840)
- Puccinia cascadensis (Savile) Cummins (1977)
- Puccinia castellana Gonz. Frag. (1916)
- Puccinia castillejae (Dietel & Holw.) Arthur (1919)
- Puccinia catamarcensis J.C. Lindq. (1958)
- Puccinia catervaria Cummins (1942)
- Puccinia caucasica Savelli (1917)
- Puccinia caudata Barclay (1891)
- Puccinia caulicola Tracy & Galloway (1888)
- Puccinia caulophylli (Kom.) Jing X. Ji & Kakishima (2020)
- Puccinia cavatica H.S. Jacks. & Holw. (1932)
- Puccinia caxiuanensis J.F. Hennen, Sotão & Rezende (2007)
- Puccinia ceanothi (Ellis & Kellerm.) Arthur (1910)
- Puccinia ceillacensis Mayor (1969)
- Puccinia celebica Gäum. (1922)
- Puccinia cellulosa Berk. & M.A. Curtis (1892)
- Puccinia celmisiae (Cooke) G. Cunn. (1924)
- Puccinia cenchri Dietel & Holw. (1897)
- Puccinia centaureae-ruthenicae Wróbl. (1914)
- Puccinia centaureae-vallesiacae Hazsl. (1908)
- Puccinia centaureae-virgatae Vienn.-Bourg. (1958)
- Puccinia centellae M.M. Chen (1980)
- Puccinia centellae-asiaticae Y.C. Wang & J.Y. Zhuang (1983)
- Puccinia cephalandrae Thüm. (1876)
- Puccinia cephalandrae-indicae Syd. & P. Syd. (1906)
- Puccinia cephalariae Vienn.-Bourg. (1985)
- Puccinia cephalotes W.T. Dale (1955)
- Puccinia cervariae Lindr. (1901)
- Puccinia cesatii J. Schröt. (1879)
- Puccinia chaerophylli Purton (1821)
- Puccinia chaerophyllina Syd. & P. Syd. (1908)
- Puccinia chaetacanthi Doidge (1927)
- Puccinia chaetii F. Kern & Thurst. (1944)
- Puccinia chaetochloae (Arthur) Arthur (1907)
- Puccinia chaetogastrae Lagerh. (1895)
- Puccinia chamaecyparidis Trotter (1912)
- Puccinia chamaemelifoliae Vienn.-Bourg. (1958)
- Puccinia chamaepeuces Maire (1937)
- Puccinia chamaesarachae P. Syd. & Syd. (1902)
- Puccinia changtuensis Y.C. Wang (1965)
- Puccinia chardoniensis Pardo-Card. (2000)
- Puccinia chaseana Arthur & Fromme (1915)
- Puccinia chasmatis Ellis & Everh. (1902)
- Puccinia chathamica McKenzie (2008)
- Puccinia cheiranthi Ellis & Everh. (1885)
- Puccinia chelonis Dietel & Holw. (1897)
- Puccinia chelonopsidis Balf.-Browne (1955)
- Puccinia chichenensis Mains (1935)
- Puccinia chihuahuana Cummins (1967)
- Puccinia chilensis Dietel & Neger (1896)
- Puccinia chimborazoensis Jørst. (1956)
- Puccinia chisosensis Cummins (1964)
- Puccinia chitralensis Jørst. (1952)
- Puccinia chloracae Parmelee (1968)
- Puccinia chloridicola Henn. (1907)
- Puccinia chloridina Bacc. (1907)
- Puccinia chloridis Speg. (1891)
- Puccinia chloridis-incompletae T.S. Ramakr., Sriniv. & Sundaram (1952)
- Puccinia chlorocrepidis Jacky (1900)
- Puccinia chondrillina Bubák & Syd. (1901)
- Puccinia chondroderma Lindr. (1901)
- Puccinia chrysanthemi Roze (1900)
- Puccinia chrysanthemicola Sousa da Câmara, Oliveira & Luz (1940)
- Puccinia chrysopogoni Barclay (1889)
- Puccinia chrysosplenii Grev. (1836)
- Puccinia chunjiei M. Liu, C.J. Li & Hambl. (2012)
- Puccinia cicutae Thüm. (1877)
- Puccinia ciliata Mains (1939)
- Puccinia cinae Tranzschel & Kuprev. (1935)
- Puccinia cinerariae McAlpine (1906)
- Puccinia cinerea Arthur (1907)
- Puccinia cingens E. Bommer & M. Rousseau (1900)
- Puccinia cinnamomea Dietel & Holw. (1897)
- Puccinia cinnamomi F.L. Tai (1947)
- Puccinia cinnamomicola Cummins (1949)
- Puccinia cipurae Syd. & P. Syd. (1907)
- Puccinia circaeae Pers. (1794)
- Puccinia circaeae-caricis Hasler (1930)
- Puccinia circinata (Schwein.) Arthur (1918)
- Puccinia circumacta Vienn.-Bourg. (1949)
- Puccinia circumalpina Zwetko (1993)
- Puccinia circumdata Mains (1935)
- Puccinia cirsii-maritimi Dietel (1922)
- Puccinia cirsii-sempervirentis Gäum. (1939)
- Puccinia cissi Cummins (1956)
- Puccinia citrata Syd. & P. Syd. (1912)
- Puccinia citricolor Cummins (1940)
- Puccinia citrina P. Syd. & Syd. (1903)
- Puccinia citrulli Syd., P. Syd. & E.J. Butler (1912)
- Puccinia citrullina Raghun. & K. Ramakr. ex Hosag. & Raghun. (1985)
- Puccinia cladiana A.L. Guyot (1938)
- Puccinia cladii Ellis & Tracy (1895)
- Puccinia cladophila Peck (1879)
- Puccinia clanwilliamensis Berndt (2010)
- Puccinia claoxyli Syd. & P. Syd. (1916)
- Puccinia clara H.S. Jacks. (1922)
- Puccinia clarioneae Dietel & Neger (1897)
- Puccinia clarioneicola P. Syd. & Syd. (1902)
- Puccinia clausenae Jørst. (1957)
- Puccinia clavata P. Syd. & Syd. (1903)
- Puccinia claviformis Lagerh. (1895)
- Puccinia clavispora Ellis & Barthol. (1896)
- Puccinia claytoniae Thüm. (1878)
- Puccinia claytoniata (Schwein.) P. Syd. & Syd. (1903)
- Puccinia claytoniicola Cummins (1952)
- Puccinia clematidicola F.L. Tai (1947)
- Puccinia clematidis (DC.) Lagerh. (1895)
- Puccinia clematidis-hayatae Sawada (1943)
- Puccinia clematidis-secalis Dupias (1948)
- Puccinia clementis Garrett (1914)
- Puccinia cleomes H.S. Jacks. & Holw. (1931)
- Puccinia clinopodii-polycephali S.X. Wei (1990)
- Puccinia clintoniae-udensis Bubák (1900)
- Puccinia clintonii Peck (1876)
- Puccinia clusii Gäum. (1943)
- Puccinia cnici H. Mart. (1817)
- Puccinia cnici-oleracei Pers. (1823)
- Puccinia cnidii Lindr. (1901)
- Puccinia cnidiicola Hirats. f. & S. Kaneko (1968)
- Puccinia coaetanea Bubák (1905)
- Puccinia cobresiae Vasyag. (1965)
- Puccinia coccocypseli H.S. Jacks. & Holw. (1932)
- Puccinia cockaynei G. Cunn. (1923)
- Puccinia cockerelliana Bethel (1919)
- Puccinia codonanthes Syd. & P. Syd. (1916)
- Puccinia codyi Savile (1974)
- Puccinia coelopleuri Arthur (1919)
- Puccinia cognata P. Syd. & Syd. (1902)
- Puccinia cognatella Bubák (1909)
- Puccinia colata J.F. Hennen & Cummins (1973)
- Puccinia coleataeniae Demers (2017)
- Puccinia collettiana Barclay (1890)
- Puccinia collinsiae Henn. (1898)
- Puccinia colossea Speg. (1925)
- Puccinia colquhouniae S.X. Wei (1990)
- Puccinia colquhouniicola J.Y. Zhuang (1995)
- Puccinia columbiensis Ellis & Everh. (1893)
- Puccinia comandrae Peck (1884)
- Puccinia commelinae Holw. (1904)
- Puccinia commelinae-benghalensis J.Y. Zhuang (1998)
- Puccinia commutata P. Syd. & Syd. (1902)
- Puccinia compacta Kunze (1828)
- Puccinia completa Jørst. (1956)
- Puccinia concinna Arthur (1905)
- Puccinia conclusa Thüm. (1878)
- Puccinia concolor Syd. & P. Syd. (1908)
- Puccinia concrescens Ellis & Everh. ex Arthur (1915)
- Puccinia concumulata H.S. Jacks. & Holw. (1932)
- Puccinia condigna H.S. Jacks. & Holw. (1932)
- Puccinia conferta Dietel & Holw. (1893)
- Puccinia confluens P. Syd. & Syd. (1902)
- Puccinia conformata Syd. (1932)
- Puccinia confraga Arthur & Cummins (1933)
- Puccinia congdonii Savile (1973)
- Puccinia congesta Berk. & Broome (1873)
- Puccinia conglobata P. Syd. & Syd. (1902)
- Puccinia conglomerata (F. Strauss) Röhl. (1813)
- Puccinia conii (F. Strauss) Fuckel (1870)
- Puccinia connersii Savile (1950)
- Puccinia conoclinii Seym. (1885)
- Puccinia conostylidis Grove (1914)
- Puccinia conquisita Cummins (1941)
- Puccinia consimilis Ellis & Everh. (1891)
- Puccinia consobrina Arthur & Holw. (1918)
- Puccinia conspersa Dietel (1897)
- Puccinia constata Syd. (1931)
- Puccinia constricta (Lagerh.) Bubák (1902)
- Puccinia consueta H.S. Jacks. & Holw. (1932)
- Puccinia consulta H.S. Jacks. & Holw. (1932)
- Puccinia contecta Syd. (1924)
- Puccinia contegens G. Cunn. (1923)
- Puccinia conturbata H.S. Jacks. & Holw. (1932)
- Puccinia convolvulacearum Mayor (1914)
- Puccinia convolvuli (Pers.) Castagne (1842)
- Puccinia conyzae Henn. (1896)
- Puccinia conyzella P. Syd. & Syd. (1902)
- Puccinia cookei De Toni (1888)
- Puccinia cooperiae Long (1902)
- Puccinia coprosmae Cooke (1890)
- Puccinia cordiae Vestergr. (1909)
- Puccinia cordiarum M. Salazar & J.C. Gómez (2012)
- Puccinia cordiicola Pardo-Card. (1997)
- Puccinia cordyceps Berndt (2002)
- Puccinia cordylanthi Blasdale (1919)
- Puccinia coreopsidis Wakef. (1918)
- Puccinia corniculata Mayor & Vienn.-Bourg. (1950)
- Puccinia cornigera Ellis & Everh. (1900)
- Puccinia cornurediata Berndt (2006)
- Puccinia cornuta Hazsl. (1877)
- Puccinia coronata Corda (1837)
- Puccinia coronati-agrostidis M. Liu & Hambl. (2012)
- Puccinia coronati-brevispora M. Liu & Hambl. (2012)
- Puccinia coronati-calamagrostidis M. Liu & Hambl. (2012)
- Puccinia coronati-japonica M. Liu & Hambl. (2012)
- Puccinia coronati-longispora M. Liu & Hambl. (2012)
- Puccinia coronillae Woron. (1922)
- Puccinia coronopsora Cummins (1949)
- Puccinia correae McAlpine (1895)
- Puccinia corrigiolae Chevall. (1826)
- Puccinia corsica Maire (1901)
- Puccinia corteyi Ranoj. (1919)
- Puccinia corteziana Cummins & J.F. Hennen (1971)
- Puccinia corticola Arthur & Rorer (1922)
- Puccinia cortusae Tranzschel (1904)
- Puccinia corvarensis Bubák (1900)
- Puccinia costi Syd. (1908)
- Puccinia costina (Syd. & P. Syd.) Cummins (1941)
- Puccinia coulterophyti Dietel & Holw. (1901)
- Puccinia courtoisiae (Syd. & P. Syd.) Syd. (1939)
- Puccinia cousiniae P. Syd. & Syd. (1902)
- Puccinia crandallii Pammel & H.H. Hume (1899)
- Puccinia crassapicalis Bubák (1914)
- Puccinia crassicutis P. Syd. & Syd. (1902)
- Puccinia crassipes Berk. & M.A. Curtis (1874)
- Puccinia crassocephali Gjaerum (1986)
- Puccinia cremanthodii J.Y. Zhuang & S.X. Wei (1989)
- Puccinia crepidicola Syd. & P. Syd. (1901)
- Puccinia crepidis J. Schröt. (1887)
- Puccinia crepidis-acuminatae Syd. & P. Syd. (1901)
- Puccinia crepidis-asadbarensis Aliabadi & M. Abbasi (2013)
- Puccinia crepidis-aureae Syd. & P. Syd. (1901)
- Puccinia crepidis-blattarioidis Hazsl. (1908)
- Puccinia crepidis-grandiflorae Hasler (1918)
- Puccinia crepidis-hookerianae Maire (1937)
- Puccinia crepidis-integrae (Lindr.) Hirats. f. (1952)
- Puccinia crepidis-jacquini P. Cruchet, E. Fisch. & Mayor (1918)
- Puccinia crepidis-japonicae (Lindr.) Dietel (1908)
- Puccinia crepidis-leontodontoidis Maire (1901)
- Puccinia crepidis-montanae Magnus (1904)
- Puccinia crepidis-sibiricae Lindr. (1900)
- Puccinia crespiana Unamuno (1935)
- Puccinia cressae Lagerh. (1889)
- Puccinia cretica Holw. (1897)
- Puccinia cribrata Arthur & Cummins (1933)
- Puccinia crinitae McNabb (1962)
- Puccinia croci Gäum. & Terrier (1952)
- Puccinia croci-pallasii Săvul. (1953)
- Puccinia crotalariae C. Mohanan (2010)
- Puccinia crotonicola Speg. (1925)
- Puccinia crotonopsidis (Burrill) Demers (2017)
- Puccinia crucheti Hasler (1918)
- Puccinia cruchetiana Mayor (1926)
- Puccinia cruciferae McAlpine (1906)
- Puccinia cruciferarum F. Rudolphi (1829)
- Puccinia crupinae Ranoj. (1914)
- Puccinia crustulosa Bacc. (1917)
- Puccinia cryptandri Ellis & Barthol. (1897)
- Puccinia cryptanthes Dietel & Holw. (1893)
- Puccinia cryptica Cooke (1892)
- Puccinia cryptostemmatis Petr. (1957)
- Puccinia cryptotaeniae Peck (1873)
- Puccinia crysanthemicola Sousa da Câmara, Oliveira & Luz (1940)
- Puccinia ctenolepidis Ramachar & Bagyan. (1986)
- Puccinia cuasoensis A.A. Carvalho & J.F. Hennen (2018)
- Puccinia cucumeris Henn. (1891)
- Puccinia cuilapensis Cummins (1943)
- Puccinia culcitii Syd. (1934)
- Puccinia culmicola Dietel (1905)
- Puccinia cumminsii M. Liu & Hambl. (2017)
- Puccinia cumula Arthur & Cummins (1933)
- Puccinia cundinamarcensis Mayor (1914)
- Puccinia cuneata Dietel (1906)
- Puccinia cuniculi G. Cunn. (1923)
- Puccinia cunilae Dietel (1899)
- Puccinia cupheae Holw. (1904)
- Puccinia curculiginis Racib. (1900)
- Puccinia curcumae T.S. Ramakr. & Sundaram (1953)
- Puccinia curicoana Syd. (1932)
- Puccinia curtipes Howe (1874)
- Puccinia cutandiae A.L. Guyot (1958)
- Puccinia cuzcoensis Arthur (1918)
- Puccinia cyani Pass. (1874)
- Puccinia cyathulicola Cummins (1952)
- Puccinia cygnorum R.G. Shivas & J. Walker (1994)
- Puccinia cymbiformis F. He & Kakish. (1993)
- Puccinia cymbopogonis Massee (1911)
- Puccinia cymbopogonis-brevipes J.M. Yen (1973)
- Puccinia cymboseridis P. Syd. & Syd. (1902)
- Puccinia cymopteri Dietel & Holw. (1893)
- Puccinia cynodontis Lacroix ex Desm. (1859)
- Puccinia cynomarathri Holw. (1913)
- Puccinia cynosuroides (Henn.) Syd. (1907)
- Puccinia cypellae H.S. Jacks. & Holw. (1926)
- Puccinia cyperi Arthur (1891)
- Puccinia cypericola S. Ahmad (1961)
- Puccinia cyperi-cristati Gjaerum (1984)
- Puccinia cyperi-fastigiati Doidge (1928)
- Puccinia cyperiphila Speg. (1925)
- Puccinia cyperi-pilosi Homma (1938)
- Puccinia cyperi-tagetiformis (Henn.) F. Kern (1919)
- Puccinia cyphochlaenae Vienn.-Bourg. (1981)
- Puccinia cypria Jørst. (1943)
- Puccinia cypripedii Arthur & Holway (1884)
- Puccinia cyrnaea Maire (1903)

== D ==
- Puccinia dactylidina Bubák (1905)
- Puccinia dactyloctenii Pat. & Har. (1908)
- Puccinia daisenensis Hirats. f. (1932)
- Puccinia dampierae P. Syd. & Syd. (1902)
- Puccinia daneshpazhuhii Ershad, M. Abbasi & Gjaerum (1997)
- Puccinia daniloi Bubák (1905)
- Puccinia danthoniae Korbonsk. (1957)
- Puccinia dasantherae Savile (1968)
- Puccinia dasypyri Guyot & Malençon (1963)
- Puccinia dayi Clinton (1876)
- Puccinia debaryana Thüm. (1875)
- Puccinia decolorata Arthur & Holw. (1925)
- Puccinia decora Dietel & Holw. (1898)
- Puccinia defecta H.S. Jacks. & Holw. (1932)
- Puccinia deformans G. Winter (1884)
- Puccinia deformata Berk. & M.A. Curtis (1868)
- Puccinia degeneris Mains & Holw. (1918)
- Puccinia dehiscens P. Syd. & Syd. (1903)
- Puccinia delavayana Pat. & Har. (1905)
- Puccinia delicatula (Arthur) Sacc. & Trotter (1912)
- Puccinia delphinensis A.L. Guyot (1947)
- Puccinia delphinii Dietel & Holw. (1893)
- Puccinia delphiniicola Jørst. (1961)
- Puccinia deminuta Vleugel (1908)
- Puccinia dendranthemae S.X. Wei & Y.C. Wang (1987)
- Puccinia densissima Speg. (1925)
- Puccinia dentariae (Alb. & Schwein.) Fuckel (1871)
- Puccinia deodikarii K.R.G. Nair (1972)
- Puccinia deosaiensis Khalid & S.H. Iqbal (1997)
- Puccinia deprecanea H.S. Jacks. & Holw. (1932)
- Puccinia depressa Dietel & Neger (1897)
- Puccinia desertorum Syd. & P. Syd. (1910)
- Puccinia desmanthodii Dietel & Holw. (1901)
- Puccinia desmazieri Const. (1916)
- Puccinia detonsa Arthur & Holw. (1918)
- Puccinia deyeuxiae F.L. Tai & C.C. Cheo (1937)
- Puccinia deyeuxiae-scabrescentis Y.Z. Wang & S.X. Wei (1980)
- Puccinia dianellae (Dietel) McTaggart & R.G. Shivas (2017)
- Puccinia diantherae Syd. (1939)
- Puccinia dianthi-japonici Henn. (1905)
- Puccinia diarrhenae Miyabe & S. Ito (1909)
- Puccinia diaziana Arthur (1905)
- Puccinia dichanthii Afshan & Khalid (2010)
- Puccinia dichelostemmae Dietel & Holw. (1895)
- Puccinia dichondrae Mont. (1852)
- Puccinia dichromenae (Arthur) H.S. Jacks. (1928)
- Puccinia diclipterae Syd. & P. Syd. (1914)
- Puccinia dictyoderma Lindr. (1901)
- Puccinia dictyospora Tranzschel (1902)
- Puccinia didymophysae Dietel (1897)
- Puccinia didyoderma Lindr. (1901)
- Puccinia dielsiana Henn. (1901)
- Puccinia dieramae P. Syd. & Syd. (1903)
- Puccinia dieteliana P. Syd. (1898)
- Puccinia dietelii Sacc. & P. Syd. (1899)
- Puccinia dietrichiana Tranzschel (1907)
- Puccinia difformis Kunze (1817)
- Puccinia diffusa Holw. (1905)
- Puccinia difonzoi J.C. Lindq. (1947)
- Puccinia digitariae Pole-Evans (1917)
- Puccinia digitariae-biformis P.B. Chavan & Hosag. (1984)
- Puccinia digitariae-velutinae Vienn.-Bourg. (1952)
- Puccinia digitariae-vestitae Ramachar & Cummins (1965)
- Puccinia digitariicola Kaps.-Gotsi (1986)
- Puccinia digna Arthur & Holw. (1925)
- Puccinia dilecta Syd. (1931)
- Puccinia dimidipes Otálora & Berndt (2018)
- Puccinia dimorpha P. Syd. & Syd. (1902)
- Puccinia dimorphothecae Pole-Evans (1916)
- Puccinia dimorphothecae-cuneatae Berndt (2020)
- Puccinia dioicae Magnus (1877)
- Puccinia dioscoreae Kom. (1899)
- Puccinia dioscoreae-mundtii Berndt, A.R. Wood & E. Uhlmann (2006)
- Puccinia diotidis Pat. & Roum. (1886)
- Puccinia diplachnicola Dietel (1910)
- Puccinia diplachnis Arthur (1904)
- Puccinia diplolophii Durrieu (1974)
- Puccinia diplopappi Syd. & P. Syd. (1915)
- Puccinia discors H.S. Jacks. & Holw. (1931)
- Puccinia discreta H.S. Jacks. & Holw. (1918)
- Puccinia dispori Syd. (1931)
- Puccinia dissotidis Henn. (1908)
- Puccinia distenta H.S. Jacks. & Holw. (1931)
- Puccinia distichlidis Ellis & Everh. (1893)
- Puccinia distichophylli E. Fisch. (1920)
- Puccinia distincta McAlpine (1895)
- Puccinia distinguenda Syd. & P. Syd. (1908)
- Puccinia distorta Holw. (1905)
- Puccinia ditassae Henn. (1896)
- Puccinia ditissima Syd. (1931)
- Puccinia diutina Mains & Holw. (1918)
- Puccinia divergens Bubák (1907)
- Puccinia dobrogensis Săvul. & O. Săvul. (1937)
- Puccinia dochmia Berk. & M.A. Curtis (1860)
- Puccinia dolomitica Kabát & Bubák (1904)
- Puccinia doloris Speg. (1881)
- Puccinia dolosa Arthur & Fromme (1915)
- Puccinia dolosoides Cummins (1945)
- Puccinia dombeyae Cummins (1952)
- Puccinia dominicana Gonz. Frag. & Cif. (1926)
- Puccinia dondiae Arthur (1915)
- Puccinia doremae Speschnew (1901)
- Puccinia dorematis-ammoniaci M. Abbasi, Hedjar. & Gjaerum (1994)
- Puccinia doronicella P. Syd. & Syd. (1902)
- Puccinia doronici Niessl (1872)
- Puccinia douglasii Ellis & Everh. (1893)
- Puccinia douradae A.A. Carvalho & J.F. Hennen (2012)
- Puccinia dovrensis A. Blytt (1896)
- Puccinia drabae F. Rudolphi (1829)
- Puccinia drabicola Savile (1974)
- Puccinia dracaenae E. Castell. (1947)
- Puccinia dracunculina Fahrend. (1941)
- Puccinia drimiae Van der Byl (1926)
- Puccinia droborii Solkina (1928)
- Puccinia droogenis E.J. Butler (1905)
- Puccinia droogensis E.J. Butler (1912)
- Puccinia dubia Mayor (1914)
- Puccinia dulichii P. Syd. & Syd. (1903)
- Puccinia dummeri Wakef. (1949)
- Puccinia dupiasii Terrier (1961)
- Puccinia duplex Jørst. (1959)
- Puccinia durangensis Cummins (1971)
- Puccinia duranii J.F. Hennen, León-Gall. & Cummins (1972)
- Puccinia durrieui Mayor (1972)
- Puccinia dusenii J.C. Lindq. (1955)
- Puccinia duthiei Ellis & Tracy (1897)
- Puccinia dyris Maire (1931)
- Puccinia dyschoristes Cummins (1943)
- Puccinia dyssodiae Cummins (1977)

== E ==
- Puccinia eatoniae Arthur (1904)
- Puccinia echeveriae Linder (1939)
- Puccinia echinophorae Brandenb. & M. Steiner (1972)
- Puccinia echinopteridis Holw. (1904)
- Puccinia echinulata Jørst. (1956)
- Puccinia ecliptae Eboh (1986)
- Puccinia ecuadorensis Arthur (1924)
- Puccinia ecuadorientalis Berndt (1998)
- Puccinia efferta Cummins (1937)
- Puccinia effusa Dietel & Holw. (1895)
- Puccinia egenula (Arthur) Barthol. (1928)
- Puccinia egmontensis G. Cunn. (1923)
- Puccinia egregia Arthur (1905)
- Puccinia egressa Arthur (1919)
- Puccinia eichelbaumii Henn. (1905)
- Puccinia ekmanii F. Kern, Cif. & Thurst. (1933)
- Puccinia elaeagni Yoshin. (1906)
- Puccinia elata J.C. Lindq. (1958)
- Puccinia electrae Dietel & Holw. (1901)
- Puccinia eleocharidis Arthur (1884)
- Puccinia elephantopi-spicati Pat. (1912)
- Puccinia elephantopodis Henn. (1900)
- Puccinia eleutherantherae Dietel (1909)
- Puccinia eleutherospermi Vienn.-Bourg. (1958)
- Puccinia elgonensis Wakef. (1949)
- Puccinia elliptica Lindr. (1901)
- Puccinia ellisiana Thüm. (1878)
- Puccinia ellisii De Toni (1888)
- Puccinia eluta Cummins (1941)
- Puccinia elymi Westend. (1852)
- Puccinia elymicola Const. (1916)
- Puccinia elymi-impatientis Davis (1919)
- Puccinia elymi-sibirici S. Ito (1909)
- Puccinia elytrariae Henn. (1895)
- Puccinia emaculata Schwein. (1832)
- Puccinia embergeriae McKenzie & P.R. Johnst. (2004)
- Puccinia emiliae Henn. (1898)
- Puccinia eminens F. Kern (1917)
- Puccinia enamii Pardo-Card. (2003)
- Puccinia enceliae Dietel & Holw. (1897)
- Puccinia enecta Speg. (1902)
- Puccinia engleriana Henn. (1904)
- Puccinia enixa Cummins (1952)
- Puccinia enneapogonis Korbonsk. (1957)
- Puccinia enormis Fuckel (1874)
- Puccinia enteropogonis P. Syd. & Syd. (1903)
- Puccinia entrerriana J.C. Lindq. (1954)
- Puccinia epicampis Arthur (1901)
- Puccinia epilobii DC. (1815)
- Puccinia epilobii-fleischeri E. Fisch. (1897)
- Puccinia epimedii (Henn. & Shirai) Miyabe & S. Ito (1913)
- Puccinia epiphylla (L.) Wettst. (1886)
- Puccinia eragrostidicola F. Kern, Thurst. & Whetzel (1933)
- Puccinia eragrostidis Petch (1917)
- Puccinia eragrostidis-arundinaceae Tranzschel (1939)
- Puccinia eragrostidis-chalcanthae Doidge (1939)
- Puccinia eragrostidis-ferrugineae F.L. Tai (1947)
- Puccinia eragrostidis-superbae Doidge (1939)
- Puccinia eremuri Kom. (1895)
- Puccinia erianthi Padwick & A. Khan (1944)
- Puccinia erianthicola Cummins (1953)
- Puccinia erigeniae (Orton) Arthur (1921)
- Puccinia erigerontis Ellis & Everh. (1897)
- Puccinia erigerontis-elongati Y.Z. Wang & S.J. Han (1980)
- Puccinia erikssonii Bubák (1904)
- Puccinia eriocyclae Khalid & S.H. Iqbal (1997)
- Puccinia eriophori Thüm. (1880)
- Puccinia eriophylli H.S. Jacks. (1918)
- Puccinia eriostemonis McAlpine (1906)
- Puccinia eritraeensis Pazschke (1893)
- Puccinia erlangeae Grove (1916)
- Puccinia erratica H.S. Jacks. & Holw. (1918)
- Puccinia erythraeensis Pazschke (1893)
- Puccinia erythropus Dietel (1905)
- Puccinia escharoides Syd. & P. Syd. (1914)
- Puccinia esclavensis Dietel & Holw. (1897)
- Puccinia espinosarum Dietel & Holw. (1901)
- Puccinia estcourtensis Gjaerum (1988)
- Puccinia ethuliae Syd. (1928)
- Puccinia eucomi Doidge (1939)
- Puccinia eulaliae Barclay (1891)
- Puccinia eulobi Dietel & Holw. (1893)
- Puccinia eumacrospora Cummins (1962)
- Puccinia euodiae Cummins (1941)
- Puccinia euodiae-trichotomae J.Y. Zhuang (1991)
- Puccinia euopla Syd. (1928)
- Puccinia eupatorii Dietel (1897)
- Puccinia eupatoriicola Mayor (1914)
- Puccinia eupatorii-columbiani Mayor (1914)
- Puccinia euphorbiae Henn. (1893)
- Puccinia euphrasiana G. Cunn. (1924)
- Puccinia eurotiae Griffiths (1907)
- Puccinia eutela Syd. (1935)
- Puccinia eutremae Lindr. (1902)
- Puccinia evansii Henn. (1908)
- Puccinia exaltata Syd. (1939)
- Puccinia examinata H.S. Jacks. & Holw. (1932)
- Puccinia exanthematica MacOwan (1882)
- Puccinia exasperans Holw. (1905)
- Puccinia excursionis Savile (1965)
- Puccinia exhauriens Thüm. (1876)
- Puccinia exhausta Dietel (1900)
- Puccinia exilis P. Syd. & Syd. (1903)
- Puccinia eximia Arthur & Holw. (1918)
- Puccinia exitiosa P. Syd., Syd. & Holw. (1902)
- Puccinia exoptata Cummins (1941)
- Puccinia exornata Arthur (1911)
- Puccinia expallens Syd. & P. Syd. (1907)
- Puccinia expetiva H.S. Jacks. & Holw. (1932)
- Puccinia eylesii Doidge (1927)

== F ==
- Puccinia faceta Syd. (1934)
- Puccinia fagarae Doidge (1927)
- Puccinia fagopyri Barclay (1890)
- Puccinia fagopyricola Jørst. (1958)
- Puccinia falcariae Fuckel (1870)
- Puccinia fallaciosa Thüm. (1876)
- Puccinia fallax Arthur (1935)
- Puccinia farameae F. Kern, Cif. & Thurst. (1933)
- Puccinia farinacea Long (1902)
- Puccinia fashamensis Ershad & Gjaerum (1986)
- Puccinia fastidiosa Sacc. & De Toni (1889)
- Puccinia fausta H.S. Jacks. & Holw. (1932)
- Puccinia feliciae Doidge (1927)
- Puccinia feliciicola Berndt (2020)
- Puccinia fendleri (Tracy & Earle) H.S. Jacks. (1918)
- Puccinia fergussonii Berk. & Broome (1875)
- Puccinia ferox Dietel & Holw. (1901)
- Puccinia ferrarisii Lindr. (1902)
- Puccinia ferruginosa P. Syd. & Syd. (1902)
- Puccinia ferulae-songaricae Tranzschel & Erem. (1939)
- Puccinia ferulae-turkestanicae Korbonsk. (1956)
- Puccinia festata H.S. Jacks. & Holw. (1931)
- Puccinia festucae Plowr. (1893)
- Puccinia festucae-ovinae F.L. Tai (1947)
- Puccinia fibigiae Petr. (1968)
- Puccinia ficalhoana Lagerh. (1890)
- Puccinia fidelis Arthur (1911)
- Puccinia filiola Mains & Holw. (1918)
- Puccinia filipodia Cummins (1937)
- Puccinia filopes Arthur & Holw. (1918)
- Puccinia fimbristylidis Arthur (1906)
- Puccinia fimbristylidis-ferrugineae Ramachar, Bhagyan. & A. Kumar (1978)
- Puccinia finschiae Cummins (1961)
- Puccinia firma Dietel (1892)
- Puccinia fischeri Cruchet & Mayor (1909)
- Puccinia flaccida Berk. & Broome (1873)
- Puccinia flahaultii Vienn.-Bourg. (1955)
- Puccinia flammuliformis I. Hino & Katum. (1960)
- Puccinia flaveriae H.S. Jacks. (1922)
- Puccinia flavescens McAlpine (1903)
- Puccinia flavipes Syd. & P. Syd. (1907)
- Puccinia flavovirens H.S. Jacks. & Holw. (1926)
- Puccinia flourensiae Henn. (1896)
- Puccinia fodiens G. Cunn. (1923)
- Puccinia fontanesii Maire (1915)
- Puccinia foyana G. Cunn. (1924)
- Puccinia fragilis Tracy & Galloway (1888)
- Puccinia fragilispora W.T. Dale (1955)
- Puccinia fragosoana Beltrán (1921)
- Puccinia francoeuriae Săvul. & Rayss (1935)
- Puccinia franseriae Syd. & P. Syd. (1903)
- Puccinia fraseri Arthur (1915)
- Puccinia fraterna H.S. Jacks. (1918)
- Puccinia fraxinata (Link) Arthur (1902)
- Puccinia freycinetiae McKenzie (1988)
- Puccinia fritschii M. Abbasi (2015)
- Puccinia fuchsiae Syd., P. Syd. & Holw. (1906)
- Puccinia fuckelii Körn. (1877)
- Puccinia fuegiana J.C. Lindq. (1957)
- Puccinia fuhrmannii Mayor (1914)
- Puccinia fuirenae Cooke (1878)
- Puccinia fuirenae-pubescentis Maire (1905)
- Puccinia fuirenella Doidge (1939)
- Puccinia fuirenicola Arthur (1919)
- Puccinia fujiensis S. Ito (1909)
- Puccinia fujisanensis Hirats. f. (1953)
- Puccinia fukienensis Y.C. Wang & J.Y. Zhuang (1983)
- Puccinia fumosa Holw. (1905)
- Puccinia fundata H.S. Jacks. & Holw. (1932)
- Puccinia fusagasugensis Salazar-Yepes & Buriticá (2008)
- Puccinia fuscata Arthur & Holw. (1918)
- Puccinia fuscella Arthur & J.R. Johnst. (1918)
- Puccinia fushunensis Hara (1927)
- Puccinia fusiformis Dietel (1897)
- Puccinia fusispora P. Syd. & Syd. (1903)

== G ==
- Puccinia gaeumannii Mayor (1946)
- Puccinia gahniae Dingley (1977)
- Puccinia gaillardiae (Dietel & Holw.) Barthol. (1928)
- Puccinia galactitis P. Syd. & Syd. (1902)
- Puccinia galatellae P. Syd. & Syd. (1902)
- Puccinia galatica P. Syd. & Syd. (1902)
- Puccinia galeniae Dietel (1903)
- Puccinia galerita Doidge (1927)
- Puccinia galii-cruciatae Duby (1830)
- Puccinia galii-elliptici Maire (1901)
- Puccinia galii-rivularis Unamuno (1934)
- Puccinia galii-silvatici G.H. Otth ex Wurth (1904)
- Puccinia galii-universa Okane & Yamaoka (2014)
- Puccinia galii-verni Ces. (1846)
- Puccinia gallula J.F. Hennen & Cummins (1973)
- Puccinia gamocarphae Klotzsch ex Henn. (1897)
- Puccinia ganeschinii Tranzschel & Erem. (1939)
- Puccinia gansensis M. Liu & Hambl. (2010)
- Puccinia garcesispora Pardo-Card. (2000)
- Puccinia garcilassae Pardo-Card. (1996)
- Puccinia garckiana Marchal & Steyaert (1929)
- Puccinia gardoquiae Dietel & Neger (1896)
- Puccinia garhadioli Esfand. (1947)
- Puccinia garnotiae T.S. Ramakr. & Sundaram (1954)
- Puccinia garrettii Arthur (1905)
- Puccinia garstfonteinii Berndt (2010)
- Puccinia gastrolobii Dietel (1922)
- Puccinia gaubae Petr. & Esfand. (1941)
- Puccinia gaudiniana A.L. Guyot (1947)
- Puccinia gayophyti J.S. Billings (1871)
- Puccinia gei McAlpine (1895)
- Puccinia gei-parviflori McNabb (1966)
- Puccinia geitonoplesii (McAlpine) McTaggart & R.G. Shivas (2017)
- Puccinia gemella Dietel & Holw. (1903)
- Puccinia gentianae (F. Strauss) Röhl. (1813)
- Puccinia gentilis Arthur (1919)
- Puccinia geophila Racib. (1900)
- Puccinia geophilae (Henn. & E. Nyman) Racib. (1900)
- Puccinia geranii Corda (1840)
- Puccinia geranii-aculeolati Petr. (1955)
- Puccinia geraniicola Speg. (1925)
- Puccinia geranii-doniani J.Y. Zhuang & S.X. Wei (2002)
- Puccinia geranii-phila J.C. Lindq. (1948)
- Puccinia geranii-pilosi McAlpine (1906)
- Puccinia geranii-polyanthis J.Y. Zhuang (1986)
- Puccinia geranii-silvatici P. Karst. (1866)
- Puccinia geranii-tuberosi Petr. (1953)
- Puccinia gerardiae Syd. & P. Syd. (1903)
- Puccinia gerardii Peck (1872)
- Puccinia gerascanthi Z. Urb. (1973)
- Puccinia gerberae Pole-Evans (1916)
- Puccinia gerbericola Doidge (1927)
- Puccinia gesneriacearum Dietel (1908)
- Puccinia ghiesbreghtii Parmelee (1968)
- Puccinia gigantea P. Karst. (1878)
- Puccinia gigantispora Bubák (1901)
- Puccinia gilgiana Henn. (1901)
- Puccinia giliae Harkn. (1884)
- Puccinia giliicola Sacc. & P. Syd. (1899)
- Puccinia gilliesii Speg. (1899)
- Puccinia gilva Arthur & Holw. (1918)
- Puccinia gjaerumii Bahç. & Kabakt. (2005)
- Puccinia glabella Holw. (1907)
- Puccinia glacieri Savile (1975)
- Puccinia gladioli Castagne (1843)
- Puccinia gladioli-crassifolii Doidge (1927)
- Puccinia glaucis Arthur (1910)
- Puccinia glechomatis DC. (1808)
- Puccinia glechonis Speg. (1912)
- Puccinia globosipes Peck (1885)
- Puccinia globulifera Arthur (1905)
- Puccinia glomerata Grev. (1837)
- Puccinia glyceriae S. Ito (1909)
- Puccinia gnaphalii (Speg.) Henn. (1902)
- Puccinia gnaphaliicola Henn. (1899)
- Puccinia gnidiae Doidge (1939)
- Puccinia goldsbroughii M. Abbasi & Aime (2016)
- Puccinia gonolobi Ravenel (1874)
- Puccinia gonospermi Magnus (1901)
- Puccinia gonzalezii Mayor (1914)
- Puccinia gorganensis Petr. (1953)
- Puccinia gouaniae Holw. (1905)
- Puccinia gouaniae-tiliifoliae Syd. (1931)
- Puccinia gouaniicola Speg. (1912)
- Puccinia goughensis Jørst. (1934)
- Puccinia gracilenta Syd., P. Syd. & E.J. Butler (1912)
- Puccinia graellsiae Magnus (1899)
- Puccinia grahamii G. Cunn. (1928)
- Puccinia graminella (Speg.) Dietel & Holw. (1895)
- Puccinia graminicola (Burrill) Demers & Castl. (2017)
- Puccinia graminis Pers. (1794)
- Puccinia granchacoensis Jørst. (1956)
- Puccinia granularis Kalchbr. & Cooke (1882)
- Puccinia granulispora Ellis & Galloway (1895)
- Puccinia grata Arthur & Cummins (1933)
- Puccinia grayiae Arthur (1934)
- Puccinia grenfelliana Savile (1965)
- Puccinia grevilleae McTaggart & R.G. Shivas (2008)
- Puccinia grindeliae Peck (1879)
- Puccinia grisea (F. Strauss) Bonord. (1860)
- Puccinia griseliniae Pazschke (1896)
- Puccinia grosii Font Quer (1923)
- Puccinia grumosa P. Syd., Syd. & Holw. (1903)
- Puccinia guaranitica Speg. (1888)
- Puccinia guardiolae Dietel & Holw. (1901)
- Puccinia guassuensis A.A. Carvalho & J.F. Hennen (2019)
- Puccinia guatemalensis Parmelee (1968)
- Puccinia guillemineae Dietel & Holw. (1897)
- Puccinia guizotiae Cummins (1952)
- Puccinia gulosa H.S. Jacks. (1920)
- Puccinia gundeliae Cooke (1880)
- Puccinia gutierreziae Ellis & Everh. (1893)
- Puccinia gyirongensis J.Y. Zhuang (1995)
- Puccinia gymnandrae Tranzschel (1891)
- Puccinia gymnocarpi Brandenb. & Poelt (1972)
- Puccinia gymnolomiae Arthur (1905)
- Puccinia gymnopetali-wightii T.S. Ramakr., Sriniv. & Sundaram (1952)
- Puccinia gymnopogonicola J.F. Hennen (1956)
- Puccinia gymnopogonis P. Syd. & Syd. (1903)
- Puccinia gymnotrichis Henn. (1896)
- Puccinia gynandriridis M. Abbasi, Hedjar. & Gjaerum (1993)
- Puccinia gypsophilae Liou & Y.C. Wang (1935)
- Puccinia gypsophilae-repentis Mayor & Cruchet (1912)

== H ==
- Puccinia habenariae Henn. (1895)
- Puccinia habranthi Dietel & Neger (1897)
- Puccinia hackeliae Cummins (1940)
- Puccinia hadacii Z. Urb. (1967)
- Puccinia haematites Syd. & P. Syd. (1910)
- Puccinia haemodori Henn. (1901)
- Puccinia hainanensis J.Y. Zhuang & S.X. Wei (1997)
- Puccinia hakkodensis Hirats. f. (1931)
- Puccinia hakodatensis Hirats. f. (1942)
- Puccinia haleniae Arthur & Holw. (1887)
- Puccinia haloragis Syd. & P. Syd. (1913)
- Puccinia halosciadis Syd. & P. Syd. (1919)
- Puccinia hansfordiana Cummins (1943)
- Puccinia hansfordii Wakef. (1949)
- Puccinia hanyuenensis F.L. Tai (1973)
- Puccinia haplopappi P. Syd. & Syd. (1902)
- Puccinia harae Savile (1974)
- Puccinia hariotii Lagerh. (1894)
- Puccinia harknessii Vize (1878)
- Puccinia harryana Jørst. (1959)
- Puccinia hashiokae Hirats. f. (1942)
- Puccinia haynaldiae Mayor & Vienn.-Bourg. (1950)
- Puccinia hectorensis G. Cunn. (1923)
- Puccinia hedbergii L. Holm (1973)
- Puccinia hederaceae McAlpine (1906)
- Puccinia hedjaroudei M. Abbasi (2006)
- Puccinia heeringiana Kleb. (1913)
- Puccinia heimerliana Bubák (1907)
- Puccinia heitoensis S. Ito & Muray. (1949)
- Puccinia heketara G. Cunn. (1924)
- Puccinia helianthellae Arthur (1904)
- Puccinia helianthemi Kravtzev (1961)
- Puccinia helianthi-mollis (Schwein.) H.S. Jacks. (1918)
- Puccinia helicalis Savile (1959)
- Puccinia heliconiae (Dietel) Arthur (1918)
- Puccinia helictotrichi Jørst. (1959)
- Puccinia heliocarpi P. Syd. & Syd. (1903)
- Puccinia heliotropii F. Kern & Kellerm. (1907)
- Puccinia heliotropiicola Speg. (1902)
- Puccinia hellenica Trotter (1905)
- Puccinia helvetica J. Schröt. (1874)
- Puccinia hemerocallidis Thüm. (1880)
- Puccinia hemigraphidis Arthur & Cummins (1937)
- Puccinia hemipogonis Henn. (1895)
- Puccinia hemisphaerica (Peck) Ellis & Everh. (1893)
- Puccinia hemizoniae Ellis & Tracy (1891)
- Puccinia hendersonii Hüseyın & Kirbağ (2001)
- Puccinia henningsii Dietel (1897)
- Puccinia hennopsiana Doidge (1927)
- Puccinia henryae Cummins (1941)
- Puccinia henryana P. Syd. & Syd. (1903)
- Puccinia heraclei Grev. (1822)
- Puccinia heracleicola Cummins (1943)
- Puccinia heraclei-nepalensis Durrieu (1979)
- Puccinia heribaudiana Har. (1914)
- Puccinia heroica Cummins (1941)
- Puccinia heteranthae Ellis & Everh. (1893)
- Puccinia heterisiae H.S. Jacks. (1920)
- Puccinia heterocolor M.M. Chen (1980)
- Puccinia heterogenea Lagerh. (1891)
- Puccinia heterophyllae Cooke (1880)
- Puccinia heteropteridis Thüm. (1877)
- Puccinia heterospora Berk. & M.A. Curtis (1868)
- Puccinia heterospora-valerianae Katajev (1951)
- Puccinia heterothalami H.S. Jacks. & Holw. (1932)
- Puccinia heucherae (Schwein.) Dietel (1891)
- Puccinia hiascens Arthur (1920)
- Puccinia hibayamensis Morim. (1959)
- Puccinia hibbertiae McAlpine (1906)
- Puccinia hibisci Henn. (1908)
- Puccinia hibisci-trioni Husseinova (1967)
- Puccinia hieraciata (Schwein.) H.S. Jacks. (1918)
- Puccinia hieracii (Röhl.) H. Mart. (1817)
- Puccinia hieraciiphila Speg. (1924)
- Puccinia hierochloae S. Ito (1909)
- Puccinia hierochloina Kleb. (1913)
- Puccinia hieroglyphica Berndt (2007)
- Puccinia hieronymi Henn. (1896)
- Puccinia hikawaensis Hirats. f. & S. Uchida (1965)
- Puccinia hilariae Cummins (1967)
- Puccinia hilleriae F. Kern & Thurst. (1944)
- Puccinia himachalensis A.K. Gautam & S. Avasthi (2016)
- Puccinia hirosakiensis Terui & Y. Harada (1973)
- Puccinia hispanica Bubák (1915)
- Puccinia hodgsoniana F. Kern (1918)
- Puccinia hoheriae Wakef. (1917)
- Puccinia holboelliae-latifoliae Cummins (1943)
- Puccinia holboellii (Hornem.) Rostr. (1888)
- Puccinia holcicola A.L. Guyot (1951)
- Puccinia hololeii Tranzschel (1939)
- Puccinia holophaea Syd. (1935)
- Puccinia holosericea Cooke (1882)
- Puccinia holwayi Dietel (1893)
- Puccinia holwayula H.S. Jacks. (1932)
- Puccinia hommae S. Ito (1938)
- Puccinia homoianthi P. Syd. & Syd. (1902)
- Puccinia hookeri P. Syd. & Syd. (1903)
- Puccinia hordei G.H. Otth (1871)
- Puccinia hordeicola J.C. Lindq. (1957)
- Puccinia hordei-maritimi A.L. Guyot (1951)
- Puccinia horiana Henn. (1901)
- Puccinia horrida Lagerh. (1895)
- Puccinia horti-kirstenboschi Berndt & E. Uhlmann (2006)
- Puccinia hoslundiae Syd. & P. Syd. (1914)
- Puccinia hostae Hara (1930)
- Puccinia houstoniae Syd. & P. Syd. (1901)
- Puccinia hsinganensis Miura (1928)
- Puccinia huallagensis Henn. (1904)
- Puccinia huberi Henn. (1900)
- Puccinia huber-morathii Petr. (1953)
- Puccinia hultenii Tranzschel & Jørst. (1934)
- Puccinia humahuacencis J.C. Lindq. (1953)
- Puccinia humationis Cummins (1939)
- Puccinia humilicola Hasler (1937)
- Puccinia humilis Speg. (1925)
- Puccinia hunzikeri J.C. Lindq. (1947)
- Puccinia hutchinsiae Dietel (1897)
- Puccinia huteri Syd. & P. Syd. (1901)
- Puccinia hyalina Dietel (1905)
- Puccinia hyalomitra Dietel & Holw. (1894)
- Puccinia hyderabadensis Bagyan. & Ravinder (1987)
- Puccinia hydnoidea (Berk. & M.A. Curtis) Arthur (1904)
- Puccinia hydrocotyles (Mont.) Cooke (1880)
- Puccinia hydrophylli Peck & Clinton (1878)
- Puccinia hyoscyami Magnus (1899)
- Puccinia hyoseridis-radiatae Maire (1905)
- Puccinia hyoseridis-scabrae Maire (1905)
- Puccinia hyparrheniae Cummins (1956)
- Puccinia hyparrheniicola Jørst. & Cummins (1956)
- Puccinia hyparrheniiphila Gjaerum (1988)
- Puccinia hyperici Doidge (1927)
- Puccinia hypochaeridis-cretensis Petr. (1943)
- Puccinia hypoxidis McAlpine (1895)
- Puccinia hyptidicola P. Syd. & Syd. (1902)
- Puccinia hyptidis (M.A. Curtis) Tracy & Earle (1895)
- Puccinia hyptidis-mutabilis Mayor (1913)
- Puccinia hyssopi Schwein. (1832)
- Puccinia hysteriiformis Peck (1881)
- Puccinia hysterium Röhl. (1813)

== I ==
- Puccinia ibozae Cummins (1952)
- Puccinia ibrae J.F. Hennen & J.W. McCain (1994)
- Puccinia ichnanthi Mains (1939)
- Puccinia idonea H.S. Jacks. & Holw. (1918)
- Puccinia ifraniana Guyot & Malençon (1957)
- Puccinia ignava (Arthur) Arthur (1922)
- Puccinia ilicis J.M. Yen & Zambett. (1977)
- Puccinia illatabilis H.S. Jacks. & Holw. (1932)
- Puccinia imitans P. Syd. & Syd. (1902)
- Puccinia immaculata Juel (1897)
- Puccinia immensispora F. Kern & Thurst. (1940)
- Puccinia impatientis-uliginosae F.L. Tai (1947)
- Puccinia impedita Mains & Holw. (1918)
- Puccinia imperatae (Magnus) G. Poirault (1913)
- Puccinia imperatoriae Jacky (1900)
- Puccinia imperatoriae-mamillata P. Cruchet (1913)
- Puccinia imperspicua P. Syd. & Syd. (1902)
- Puccinia impetrabilis H.S. Jacks. & Holw. (1932)
- Puccinia impolita H.S. Jacks. & Holw. (1932)
- Puccinia impressa Syd. (1926)
- Puccinia improcera H.S. Jacks. & Holw. (1932)
- Puccinia improvisa H.S. Jacks. & Holw. (1932)
- Puccinia inaequata H.S. Jacks. & Holw. (1918)
- Puccinia inanipes Dietel & Holw. (1901)
- Puccinia inaudita H.S. Jacks. & Holw. (1918)
- Puccinia inayatii Syd. & P. Syd. (1907)
- Puccinia incallida Cummins (1939)
- Puccinia inclita Arthur (1919)
- Puccinia inclusa P. Syd. & Syd. (1902)
- Puccinia incomposita (F. Kern) Barthol. (1928)
- Puccinia incondita Arthur (1918)
- Puccinia inconspicua Dietel (1897)
- Puccinia indagata H.S. Jacks. & Holw. (1932)
- Puccinia indecorata H.S. Jacks. & Holw. (1932)
- Puccinia indotata Cummins (1941)
- Puccinia inermis H.S. Jacks. & Holw. (1918)
- Puccinia inflata Arthur (1906)
- Puccinia inflorescenticola Pole-Evans (1916)
- Puccinia infra-aequatorialis Jørst. (1934)
- Puccinia infrequens Holw. (1905)
- Puccinia infuscans Arthur & Holw. (1918)
- Puccinia iniapii Buriticá (1978)
- Puccinia inopina H.S. Jacks. & Holw. (1932)
- Puccinia inopinata P. Syd. & Syd. (1902)
- Puccinia inornata G. Cunn. (1923)
- Puccinia inrecta H.S. Jacks. & Holw. (1931)
- Puccinia insignis Holw. (1904)
- Puccinia insititia Arthur (1915)
- Puccinia insolita Syd. & P. Syd. (1909)
- Puccinia insueta G. Winter (1887)
- Puccinia insulana (Arthur) H.S. Jacks. (1918)
- Puccinia interjecta H.S. Jacks. (1932)
- Puccinia intermedia Dietel & Holw. (1893)
- Puccinia intermixta Peck (1879)
- Puccinia interveniens (Peck) Bethel (1919)
- Puccinia intumescens (P. Syd. & Syd.) Holw. (1907)
- Puccinia intybi (Juel) Syd. & P. Syd. (1901)
- Puccinia invaginata Arthur & J.R. Johnst. (1918)
- Puccinia invelata H.S. Jacks. (1919)
- Puccinia invenusta Syd. & P. Syd. (1907)
- Puccinia investita Schwein. (1832)
- Puccinia ipomoeae Cooke ex Lagerh. (1895)
- Puccinia iporangae A.A. Carvalho & J.F. Hennen (2018)
- Puccinia iridis Wallr. ex Rabenh. (1844)
- Puccinia iriensis Morim. (1962)
- Puccinia iporangae A.A. Carvalho & J.F. Hennen (2018)
- Puccinia iridis Wallr. ex Rabenh. (1844)
- Puccinia iriensis Morim. (1962)
- Puccinia irregularis Dietel (1897)
- Puccinia irrequisita H.S. Jacks. ex Arthur (1921)
- Puccinia isachnes Petch (1922)
- Puccinia isachnicola Pardo-Card. (2003)
- Puccinia ischaemi Dietel (1918)
- Puccinia ishikariensis S. Ito (1909)
- Puccinia ishikawae S. Ito (1909)
- Puccinia ishizuchiensis Hirats. f. (1952)
- Puccinia isiacae (Thüm.) G. Winter (1887)
- Puccinia isoderma Lindr. (1901)
- Puccinia isoglossae Doidge (1927)
- Puccinia isolepidis Gjaerum (1990)
- Puccinia isopyri Tranzschel (1933)
- Puccinia istriaca Syd. & P. Syd. (1903)
- Puccinia itatiayensis J.C. Lindq. (1960)
- Puccinia ivanitzkiae Tranzschel (1933)
- Puccinia iwakuniensis Morim. (1959)
- Puccinia iwateyamensis Hirats. f. (1935)
- Puccinia ixeridicola Cummins (1940)
- Puccinia ixeridis Cummins (1940)

== J ==
- Puccinia jaagii Boedijn (1940)
- Puccinia jabalpurensis Bhanu (2009)
- Puccinia jackyana Gäum. ex Jørst. (1961)
- Puccinia jaffueliana Speg. (1921)
- Puccinia jageana M. Scholler, H. Thiel & Klenke (2015)
- Puccinia jahandiezii Maire (1921)
- Puccinia jahnii Syd. (1930)
- Puccinia jalapensis (Holw.) Barthol. ex Cummins (1956)
- Puccinia jaliscana Arthur (1905)
- Puccinia jaliscensis Holw. (1904)
- Puccinia jambolani Rangel (1912)
- Puccinia jambosae Henn. (1902)
- Puccinia jamesiana (Peck) Arthur (1903)
- Puccinia japonensis Jing X. Ji & Kakish. (2021)
- Puccinia japonica Dietel (1900)
- Puccinia jasiones-orbiculatae Hafellner (1979)
- Puccinia jasminicola T.S. Ramakr. & K. Ramakr. (1949)
- Puccinia jasmini-humilis Jørst. (1959)
- Puccinia jericosensis Pardo-Card. (1997)
- Puccinia joannesiae Henn. (1896)
- Puccinia joerstadiana J.C. Lindq. (1960)
- Puccinia joerstadii Rytz (1927)
- Puccinia jogashimensis Hirats. f. & S. Kaneko (1966)
- Puccinia johnstonii Arthur (1918)
- Puccinia johreniae Dietel (1930)
- Puccinia johreniae-alpinae Dietel (1930)
- Puccinia jonesii Peck (1881)
- Puccinia jordanovii Hinkova (1963)
- Puccinia jostephanes Dietel & Holw. (1901)
- Puccinia jovis Gäum. (1937)
- Puccinia juncelli Dietel (1910)
- Puccinia junci-oxycarpi Doidge (1941)
- Puccinia juncophila Cooke & Massee (1893)
- Puccinia junggarensis S.X. Wei & J.Y. Zhuang (1991)
- Puccinia jungiae Henn. (1897)
- Puccinia jurineae Cooke (1880)
- Puccinia jurineae-humilis Maire (1937)
- Puccinia jussiaeae Speg. (1881)
- Puccinia justiciae Puttemans (1934)

== K ==
- Puccinia kaernbachii (Henn.) Arthur (1919)
- Puccinia kakamariensis Wakef. & Hansf. (1949)
- Puccinia kalchbrenneri De Toni (1888)
- Puccinia kalchbrenneriana De Toni (1888)
- Puccinia kalimeridis P. Syd. & Syd. (1902)
- Puccinia kampalensis Cummins (1945)
- Puccinia kangrikarpoensis J.Y. Zhuang (1986)
- Puccinia kansensis Ellis & Barthol. (1896)
- Puccinia karelica Tranzschel (1905)
- Puccinia karstenii Lindr. (1901)
- Puccinia katajevii Jørst. (1958)
- Puccinia kawakamiensis Kakish. & S. Sato (1984)
- Puccinia kawandensis Cummins (1953)
- Puccinia keae G. Cunn. (1928)
- Puccinia kellermanii F. Kern (1917)
- Puccinia kelseyi P. Syd. & Syd. (1904)
- Puccinia keniensis Jørst. (1956)
- Puccinia kenmorensis Cummins (1945)
- Puccinia kentaniensis Pole-Evans (1917)
- Puccinia kentrophylli P. Syd. & Syd. (1902)
- Puccinia kenyana Cummins (1952)
- Puccinia kermanensis P. Syd. & Syd. (1902)
- Puccinia khalkhalensis Ershad, M. Abbasi & Gjaerum (1997)
- Puccinia khanspurica Khalid & Afshan (2009)
- Puccinia kigeziensis Wakef. & Hansf. (1949)
- Puccinia kimurae Hirats. f. & Yoshin. (1935)
- Puccinia kinseyi G. Cunn. (1928)
- Puccinia kirkii G. Cunn. (1923)
- Puccinia kiusiana Hirats. f. (1943)
- Puccinia klugkistiana (Dietel) Jing X. Ji & Kakish. (2017)
- Puccinia knersvlaktensis Mennicken, W. Maier, Crous & Oberw. (2005)
- Puccinia kobistanica Uljan. (1962)
- Puccinia kochiae Massee (1893)
- Puccinia kochiana Gäum. (1934)
- Puccinia koedoeensis Doidge (1927)
- Puccinia koeleriae Arthur (1910)
- Puccinia koeleriicola Tranzschel (1939)
- Puccinia koherika G. Cunn. (1930)
- Puccinia komarovii Tranzschel ex P. Syd. & Syd. (1903)
- Puccinia kondeensis Gjaerum (1990)
- Puccinia kopetdaghensis Katajev (1951)
- Puccinia kopoti G. Cunn. (1923)
- Puccinia kourouensis Berndt (2012)
- Puccinia kozukensis Dietel (1902)
- Puccinia kraussiana Cooke (1882)
- Puccinia kreageri Ricker (1905)
- Puccinia kreiselii M. Scholler (1996)
- Puccinia krigiae P. Syd. & Syd. (1902)
- Puccinia krookii Henn. (1900)
- Puccinia krupae Wróbl. (1916)
- Puccinia kuehnii (W. Krüger) E.J. Butler (1914)
- Puccinia kukkonensis Savile (1962)
- Puccinia kundmanniae Lindr. (1902)
- Puccinia kunthiana T.S. Ramakr., Sriniv. & Sundaram (1953)
- Puccinia kuntzii H.S. Jacks. (1918)
- Puccinia kunzeana Henn. (1894)
- Puccinia kupferi Mayor (1969)
- Puccinia kupreviczii Golovin (1950)
- Puccinia kurdistanica Cooke (1876)
- Puccinia kusanoi Dietel (1899)
- Puccinia kwangsiana Cummins (1951)
- Puccinia kwanhsienensis F.L. Tai (1947)
- Puccinia kweichowana Cummins (1951)
- Puccinia kyangjinensis Y. Ono, Adhikari & Rajbh. (1988)
- Puccinia kyllingae-brevifoliae Miura (1938)
- Puccinia kyllingicola Doidge (1939)

== L ==
- Puccinia lacerata (Orton) Sacc. & Trotter (1925)
- Puccinia lactucae Dietel (1900)
- Puccinia lactucae-debilis Dietel (1908)
- Puccinia lactucae-denticulatae Dietel (1905)
- Puccinia lactucae-repentis Miyabe & T. Miyake (1913)
- Puccinia lactucarum P. Syd. (1900)
- Puccinia lactucicola Miura (1913)
- Puccinia lactucina P. Syd. & Syd. (1902)
- Puccinia lagenophorae Cooke (1884)
- Puccinia lagerheimii Lindr. (1901)
- Puccinia lagoensis Henn. (1908)
- Puccinia lagophyllae Dietel & Holw. (1893)
- Puccinia lagunensis Jørst. (1958)
- Puccinia laguri Jaap (1916)
- Puccinia laguri-chamaemoly Maire (1919)
- Puccinia lakanensis M.M. Chen & Y.Z. Wang (1979)
- Puccinia lantanae Farl. (1883)
- Puccinia lapathicola Hyl., Jørst. & Nannf. (1953)
- Puccinia lapponica Rytz (1927)
- Puccinia lapsanae Fuckel (1860)
- Puccinia largifica Cummins (1941)
- Puccinia laschii Lagerh. (1895)
- Puccinia laserpitii Lindr. (1902)
- Puccinia lasiacidis F. Kern (1938)
- Puccinia lasiagrostis Tranzschel (1939)
- Puccinia lateripes Berk. & Ravenel (1874)
- Puccinia lateritia Berk. & M.A. Curtis (1854)
- Puccinia latimamma J.Y. Zhuang & S.X. Wei (2000)
- Puccinia launaeae Maire (1906)
- Puccinia laundonii L. Holm (1973)
- Puccinia laurentiana Trel. (1904)
- Puccinia laurifoliae R.W. Davidson (1932)
- Puccinia lavroviana Cummins (1971)
- Puccinia lavrovii Azbukina (1972)
- Puccinia leersiae Khalid & Afshan (2010)
- Puccinia leiocarpa Thirum. (1941)
- Puccinia leioderma Lindr. (1902)
- Puccinia lentapiculata Berndt (1998)
- Puccinia leochroma Syd. & P. Syd. (1912)
- Puccinia leonotidicola Henn. (1903)
- Puccinia leonotidis (Henn.) Arthur (1921)
- Puccinia leontopodii Voglino (1896)
- Puccinia lepidii Thüm. (1882)
- Puccinia lepidolophae Tranzschel & Erem. (1939)
- Puccinia lepistemonis Henn. (1905)
- Puccinia leptochloae Arthur & Fromme (1915)
- Puccinia leptochloae-uniflorae Cummins (1971)
- Puccinia leptoderma Dietel (1899)
- Puccinia leptosperma P. Syd. & Syd. (1903)
- Puccinia leptospora Ricker (1905)
- Puccinia lepturi Hirats. f. (1941)
- Puccinia le-testui Maubl. (1906)
- Puccinia leucadis P. Syd. & Syd. (1902)
- Puccinia leucanthemi-kurilensis Azbukina (1972)
- Puccinia leucanthemi-vernae Gäum. (1939)
- Puccinia leucheriae Dietel & Neger (1897)
- Puccinia leucheriana Sacc. & Trotter (1912)
- Puccinia leucheriicola P. Syd. & Syd. (1902)
- Puccinia leucocephala J.Y. Zhuang & S.X. Wei (1997)
- Puccinia leucophaea Syd., P. Syd. & E.J. Butler (1912)
- Puccinia leuzeae P. Syd. & Syd. (1902)
- Puccinia levata J.F. Hennen & Hodges (1981)
- Puccinia leveillei Mont. (1852)
- Puccinia levis (Sacc. & Bizz.) Magnus (1891)
- Puccinia liabi Mayor (1914)
- Puccinia liabicola F. Kern & Thurst. (1940)
- Puccinia libani Magnus (1900)
- Puccinia libanotidis Lindr. (1901)
- Puccinia liberta F. Kern (1919)
- Puccinia liebenbergii Doidge (1939)
- Puccinia lifuensis B. Huguenin (1968)
- Puccinia ligericae P. Syd. (1892)
- Puccinia ligulariae Miyabe & T. Miyake (1924)
- Puccinia ligustici Ellis & Everh. (1895)
- Puccinia ligusticicola T. Miyake (1906)
- Puccinia ligustici-jeholensis J.Y. Zhuang & S.X. Wei (2000)
- Puccinia liliacearum Duby (1830)
- Puccinia lilloana J.C. Lindq. (1958)
- Puccinia limnodeae Cummins (1971)
- Puccinia linariae Kirgizb. (1986)
- Puccinia lindaviana Henn. (1895)
- Puccinia linderae-setchuenensis J.Y. Zhuang (1990)
- Puccinia lindrothii Syd. ex Lindr. (1902)
- Puccinia lineariformis Syd. & P. Syd. (1913)
- Puccinia lineatula Bubák (1914)
- Puccinia linkii Klotzsch (1833)
- Puccinia linosyridis-caricis E. Fisch. (1904)
- Puccinia linosyridis-vernae Gäum. (1939)
- Puccinia lioui J.Y. Zhuang (1989)
- Puccinia lippiae Speg. (1898)
- Puccinia lippiicola Pat. & Har. (1908)
- Puccinia lippiivora Syd. & P. Syd. (1909)
- Puccinia lisianthi H.S. Jacks. & Holw. (1931)
- Puccinia lithospermi Ellis & Kellerm. (1885)
- Puccinia litseae-elongatae J.Y. Zhuang (1990)
- Puccinia littoralis Rostr. (1876)
- Puccinia litvinovii Tranzschel & Erem. (1939)
- Puccinia ljulinica Hinkova & Koeva (1966)
- Puccinia lobata Berk. & M.A. Curtis (1874)
- Puccinia lobeliae W.R. Gerard (1873)
- Puccinia lojkaiana Thüm. (1876)
- Puccinia loliicola Vienn.-Bourg. (1937)
- Puccinia lomatogonii Petr. (1947)
- Puccinia longa Jørst. (1959)
- Puccinia longiana Syd. & P. Syd. (1901)
- Puccinia longicornis Pat. & Har. (1891)
- Puccinia longinqua Cummins (1951)
- Puccinia longior (Savile) Azbukina (2005)
- Puccinia longipedicellata Barthol. (1928)
- Puccinia longirostris Kom. (1895)
- Puccinia longirostroides Jørst. (1959)
- Puccinia longispora McAlpine (1905)e
- Puccinia longissima J. Schröt. (1879)
- Puccinia loranthi Speg. (1884)
- Puccinia loranthicola McAlpine (1906)
- Puccinia lorentzianae J.C. Lindq. (1952)
- Puccinia lorentzii Henn. (1896)
- Puccinia loudetiae Wakef. & Hansf. (1949)
- Puccinia loudetiae-superbae Cummins (1956)
- Puccinia luandensis P. Syd. & Syd. (1902)
- Puccinia lucida A.L. Guyot (1938)
- Puccinia lucumae F. Kern, Thurst. & Whetzel (1933)
- Puccinia ludibunda Ellis & Everh. (1893)
- Puccinia ludovicianae Fahrend. (1941)
- Puccinia ludwigiae Holw. (1907)
- Puccinia ludwigii Tepper (1890)
- Puccinia lugoae Magnus (1901)
- Puccinia lupinicola Gäum. (1947)
- Puccinia luteobasis Ellis & Everh. (1897)
- Puccinia luxurians Dietel & Neger (1897)
- Puccinia luxuriosa P. Syd. & Syd. (1904)
- Puccinia luzulae Lib. (1830)
- Puccinia luzulicola Speg. (1924)
- Puccinia luzulina Syd. & P. Syd. (1919)
- Puccinia luzuriagae-polyphyllae Berndt (2010)
- Puccinia lychnidis-miquelianae Dietel (1907)
- Puccinia lycii Kalchbr. (1882)
- Puccinia lyciicola Speg. (1898)
- Puccinia lycoridicola Hirats. f. & Hara (1943)
- Puccinia lygodesmiae Ellis & Everh. (1893)
- Puccinia lyngbyei Miura (1913)
- Puccinia lyngei Jørst. (1923)
- Puccinia lysimachiae P. Karst. (1878)
- Puccinia lythri Syrgij (1964)

== M ==
- Puccinia macalpinei P. Syd. & Syd. (1902)
- Puccinia macbrideana Cummins (1945)
- Puccinia machalillae Berndt (1998)
- Puccinia machili Cummins (1949)
- Puccinia machilicola Cummins (1949)
- Puccinia macintiriana (Barclay) Barclay (1891)
- Puccinia macowanii G. Winter (1885)
- Puccinia macra Arthur & Holw. (1918)
- Puccinia macrachaenii Dietel & Neger (1899)
- Puccinia macrocarya Racib. (1900)
- Puccinia macrocephala Speg. (1891)
- Puccinia macropoda Speg. (1880)
- Puccinia macrorhynchi Rabenh. (1878)
- Puccinia macrosora Golovin (1950)
- Puccinia maculicola J.V. Almeida & Sousa da Câmara (1903)
- Puccinia maculosa Schwein. (1832)
- Puccinia macumba A.A. Carvalho & J.F. Hennen (2012)
- Puccinia madiae P. Syd. & Syd. (1902)
- Puccinia madritensis Maire (1919)
- Puccinia magellanica (Berk.) E.K. Cash (1972)
- Puccinia magnoecia Ellis & Everh. (1895)
- Puccinia magnusiana Körn. (1876)
- Puccinia magydaridis Pat. & Trab. (1897)
- Puccinia mahoniae Cummins (1965)
- Puccinia maianthemi Dietel (1900)
- Puccinia major Dietel (1894)
- Puccinia majoricensis Maire (1905)
- Puccinia majuscula H.S. Jacks. & Holw. (1932)
- Puccinia makenensis Cummins (1941)
- Puccinia makiana Hirats. (1939)
- Puccinia malabailae Bubák (1900)
- Puccinia malalhuensis J.C. Lindq. (1963)
- Puccinia malatyensis Gjaerum & Bahç. (2003)
- Puccinia maligna Dietel (1914)
- Puccinia mallae Durrieu (1979)
- Puccinia malvacearum Bertero ex Mont. (1852)
- Puccinia malvastri Peck (1885)
- Puccinia mammillata Bagnis (1877)
- Puccinia manangensis Durrieu (1979)
- Puccinia mandevillae H.S. Jacks. & Holw. (1931)
- Puccinia mandshurica Miura (1928)
- Puccinia mania G. Cunn. (1930)
- Puccinia manoutcherii Vienn.-Bourg. (1971)
- Puccinia manuelensis A.A. Carvalho & J.F. Hennen (2012)
- Puccinia mapaniae Racib. (1900)
- Puccinia marchionattoi J.C. Lindq. (1953)
- Puccinia mariae H.S. Jacks. (1932)
- Puccinia mariae-wilsoniae Clinton (1873)
- Puccinia mariana Sacc. (1915)
- Puccinia marianae Syd. & P. Syd. (1901)
- Puccinia marisci Mayor (1914)
- Puccinia mariscicola J.M. Yen (1972)
- Puccinia maritima Gäum. (1958)
- Puccinia marquesii Rolland (1904)
- Puccinia marrubii Kabakt., Mutlu, Karakuş & Akata (2016)
- Puccinia marsdeniae Dietel & Holw. (1901)
- Puccinia martianoffiana Thüm. (1877)
- Puccinia marylandica Lindr. (1901)
- Puccinia massalis Arthur (1919)
- Puccinia matricariae Syd. (1930)
- Puccinia maublancii Rangel (1917)
- Puccinia maupasii Maire (1927)
- Puccinia maurea G. Cunn. (1930)
- Puccinia maureanui McKenzie & Padamsee (2022)
- Puccinia mauritanica Maire (1915)
- Puccinia maximiliani Jørst. (1957)
- Puccinia mayerhansii Mayor (1914)
- Puccinia mayoriana Gäum. (1939)
- Puccinia mayorii E. Fisch. (1904)
- Puccinia mayorii-eugenei Vienn.-Bourg. (1955)
- Puccinia mcclatchieana Dietel & Holw. (1894)
- Puccinia mccleanii Doidge (1941)
- Puccinia mcvaughii J.F. Hennen, León-Gall. & Cummins (1972)
- Puccinia medellinensis Mayor (1914)
- Puccinia mediterranea Trotter (1912)
- Puccinia medogensis J.Y. Zhuang (1986)
- Puccinia megatherium P. Syd. & Syd. (1903)
- Puccinia mei-mamillata Semadeni (1903)
- Puccinia melampodii Dietel & Holw. (1897)
- Puccinia melanconioides Ellis & Harkn. (1884)
- Puccinia melandrii Plats (1983)
- Puccinia melanida Syd. (1924)
- Puccinia melanocephala Syd. & P. Syd. (1907)
- Puccinia melanographa Petr. (1940)
- Puccinia melanoplaca Syd. & P. Syd. (1909)
- Puccinia melanopsis P. Syd. & Syd. (1903)
- Puccinia melanosora Speg. (1880)
- Puccinia melantherae Henn. (1897)
- Puccinia melanthii Bubák (1900)
- Puccinia melasmioides Tranzschel (1903)
- Puccinia melicae P. Syd. & Syd. (1903)
- Puccinia melicae-porteri M. Abbasi & Aime (2016)
- Puccinia melicina Arthur & Holw. (1925)
- Puccinia melitellae Pantidou & D.M. Hend. (1977)
- Puccinia melitenensis Kabakt., Mutlu & Karakuş (2015)
- Puccinia mellea Dietel & Neger (1897)
- Puccinia mellifera Dietel & Holw. (1893)
- Puccinia meloncilloi J.C. Lindq. (1952)
- Puccinia melothriae F. Stevens (1907)
- Puccinia melothriicola Syd. & P. Syd. (1917)
- Puccinia membranacea Dietel (1899)
- Puccinia mendozana Speg. (1925)
- Puccinia menthae Pers. (1801)
- Puccinia mera Cummins (1940)
- Puccinia mercei Durrieu (1987)
- Puccinia meridensis F. Kern (1938)
- Puccinia merrilliana McTaggart & R.G. Shivas (2017)
- Puccinia merrillii Henn. (1908)
- Puccinia mesembryanthemi MacOwan (1892)
- Puccinia meshhedensis Petr. (1940)
- Puccinia mesnieriana Thüm. (1878)
- Puccinia mesobulbosae Eboh (1986)
- Puccinia mesomajalis Berk. & M.A. Curtis (1873)
- Puccinia mesomegala Berk. & M.A. Curtis (1874)
- Puccinia mesomorpha Syd. & P. Syd. (1910)
- Puccinia metanarthecii Pat. (1886)
- Puccinia metastelmatis Henn. (1896)
- Puccinia mexicana Dietel & Holw. (1897)
- Puccinia mexicensis H.C. Greene & Cummins (1958)
- Puccinia micranthae Griffiths (1902)
- Puccinia microhyalinis Salazar-Yepes & Buriticá (2008)
- Puccinia microica Ellis (1893)
- Puccinia microlonchi P. Syd. & Syd. (1902)
- Puccinia micromeriae Dudley & C.H. Thomps. (1904)
- Puccinia microseridis McAlpine (1895)
- Puccinia microsora Körn. (1874)
- Puccinia microsphincta Lindr. (1902)
- Puccinia microspora Dietel (1905)
- Puccinia microthelis Syd. (1928)
- Puccinia mikaniae H.S. Jacks. & Holw. (1932)
- Puccinia mikaniae-micranthae Viégas (1945)
- Puccinia mikanifolia H.S. Jacks. & Holw. (1932)
- Puccinia milii Erikss. (1895)
- Puccinia millegranae Cummins (1956)
- Puccinia milovidoviae Plats (1983)
- Puccinia mimosae P. Syd. & Syd. (1904)
- Puccinia minshanensis J.Y. Zhuang & S.X. Wei (1999)
- Puccinia minuscula Arthur (1924)
- Puccinia minussensis Thüm. (1878)
- Puccinia minutissima Arthur (1907)
- Puccinia minutula Peck (1872)
- Puccinia mirandensis F. Kern & Thurst. (1944)
- Puccinia mirifica Dietel & Holw. (1895)
- Puccinia miscanthi Miura (1928)
- Puccinia miscanthicola F.L. Tai & C.C. Cheo (1937)
- Puccinia miscanthidii Doidge (1939)
- Puccinia missouriensis Arthur (1918)
- Puccinia mitoensis J.W. Baxter (1953)
- Puccinia mitracarpi O.L. Pereira & R.W. Barreto (2005)
- Puccinia mitrata P. Syd. & Syd. (1902)
- Puccinia mitriformis S. Ito (1909)
- Puccinia miurae Syd. & P. Syd. (1913)
- Puccinia miyabeana T. Miyake (1906)
- Puccinia miyakei Syd. & P. Syd. (1909)
- Puccinia miyoshiana Dietel (1899)
- Puccinia modesta Jørst. (1956)
- Puccinia modica Holw. (1904)
- Puccinia modiolae P. Syd. & Syd. (1903)
- Puccinia moelleriana Henn. (1895)
- Puccinia mogiphanis (Juel) Arthur (1918)
- Puccinia moiwensis Miura (1913)
- Puccinia moliniae Tul. (1854)
- Puccinia moliniicola Cummins (1951)
- Puccinia molokaiensis Cummins (1937)
- Puccinia momordicae Kalchbr. (1879)
- Puccinia monardae J.W. Baxter (1960)
- Puccinia monardellae Dudley & C.H. Thomps. (1904)
- Puccinia monoica (Peck) Arthur (1912)
- Puccinia monopora Lindr. (1901)
- Puccinia monsfontium Berndt (2010)
- Puccinia monsoniae (Syd. & P. Syd.) Doidge (1927)
- Puccinia montagnei De Toni (1888)
- Puccinia montana Fuckel (1874)
- Puccinia montanensis Ellis (1893)
- Puccinia monticola Kom. (1895)
- Puccinia montisfontium B. Huguenin (1968)
- Puccinia montis-venenosi Berndt (2009)
- Puccinia montivaga Bubák (1905)
- Puccinia montoyae Mayor (1914)
- Puccinia montserrates Mayor (1914)
- Puccinia morata Cummins (1949)
- Puccinia moreniana Dudley & C.H. Thomps. (1904)
- Puccinia morganae Doidge (1939)
- Puccinia morigera Cummins (1951)
- Puccinia moringae Koord. (1907)
- Puccinia moriokaensis S. Ito (1909)
- Puccinia morobeana Cummins (1940)
- Puccinia morobensis Cummins (1941)
- Puccinia morotoensis Gjaerum (1984)
- Puccinia morreniae (Speg.) Speg. (1925)
- Puccinia morrisonii McAlpine (1906)
- Puccinia morthieri Körn. (1887)
- Puccinia moschariae Vestergr. (1909)
- Puccinia moschata G. Cunn. (1930)
- Puccinia moschopsidis J.C. Lindq. (1955)
- Puccinia mougeotii Lagerh. (1895)
- Puccinia moyanoi Speg. (1909)
- Puccinia muehlenbeckiae (Cooke) P. Syd. & Syd. (1903)
- Puccinia mulgedii P. Syd. & Syd. (1902)
- Puccinia multiloculata Cummins (1941)
- Puccinia munbyi Gäum. (1934)
- Puccinia mundula H.S. Jacks. & Holw. (1931)
- Puccinia munita F. Ludw. (1892)
- Puccinia murashkinskii Tranzschel (1933)
- Puccinia musenii Ellis & Everh. (1900)
- Puccinia mussonii McAlpine (1906)
- Puccinia mutabilis Ellis & Galloway (1889)
- Puccinia mutisiae Lagerh. (1895)
- Puccinia mutisiicola Speg. (1909)
- Puccinia myosotidis Tranzschel (1904)
- Puccinia myrsiphylli (Thüm.) G. Winter (1884)
- Puccinia mysorensis Syd., P. Syd. & E.J. Butler (1906)
- Puccinia mysuruensis Mahadevak., L.J. Szabo & Janardhana (2016)

== N ==
- Puccinia nabali Arthur (1910)
- Puccinia nabugaboensis Gjaerum (1984)
- Puccinia nakanishikii Dietel (1905)
- Puccinia namibiana Mennicken, W. Maier & Oberw. (2005)
- Puccinia namjagbarwana B. Li & J.Y. Zhuang (1988)
- Puccinia namua G. Cunn. (1924)
- Puccinia nandinae-domesticae P. Zhao & L. Cai (2021)
- Puccinia nanomitra P. Syd. & Syd. (1902)
- Puccinia narcissi G.F. Laundon (1965)
- Puccinia nardosmiae Ellis & Everh. (1885)
- Puccinia narduri Gonz. Frag. (1914)
- Puccinia narinensis F. Kern & Whetzel (1930)
- Puccinia nassellae Arthur & Holw. (1925)
- Puccinia nastanthi Speg. (1902)
- Puccinia nasuensis Hirats. (1939)
- Puccinia natalensis Dietel & P. Syd. (1899)
- Puccinia naufraga Berndt (2009)
- Puccinia naumovii Golovin (1950)
- Puccinia necopina Grove (1916)
- Puccinia negeriana Dietel (1896)
- Puccinia negrensis Henn. (1904)
- Puccinia nemophila Speg. (1925)
- Puccinia nemoralis Juel (1894)
- Puccinia neocoronata vH.C. Greene & Cummins (1958)
- Puccinia neohyptidis G.F. Laundon (1975)
- Puccinia neoporteri I. Hino & Katum. (1965)
- Puccinia neorotundata Cummins (1956)
- Puccinia neovelutina Kakish., Jing X. Ji & T. Kasuya (2017)
- Puccinia nepalensis Barclay & Dietel (1890)
- Puccinia nepetae Togashi (1924)
- Puccinia nephrophylli Henn. (1895)
- Puccinia nephrophyllidii Mains (1939)
- Puccinia nervincola Lagerh. (1902)
- Puccinia nesaeae (W.R. Gerard) Ellis & Everh. (1895)
- Puccinia nesodes Arthur & Holw. (1918)
- Puccinia nevadensis Syd. & P. Syd. (1916)
- Puccinia nevodovskii Gamalizk. (1958)
- Puccinia neyraudiae Syd. & P. Syd. (1912)
- Puccinia nicotianae Arthur (1918)
- Puccinia niederleinii Henn. (1896)
- Puccinia nigroconoidea I. Hino & Katum. (1960)
- Puccinia nigrolinearis Okane & Kakish. (1992)
- Puccinia nigrovelata Ellis & Tracy (1895)
- Puccinia niitakensis Hirats. f. & Hashioka (1934)
- Puccinia nipponica Dietel (1900)
- Puccinia nishidana Henn. (1901)
- Puccinia nitida Barclay (1890)
- Puccinia nitidula Tranzschel (1911)
- Puccinia niveoides Cummins (1940)
- Puccinia noackii Syd. & P. Syd. (1907)
- Puccinia noccae Arthur (1905)
- Puccinia nociva H.S. Jacks. & Holw. (1926)
- Puccinia nocticolor Holw. (1904)
- Puccinia nodosa Ellis & Harkn. (1884)
- Puccinia nokoensis Sawada (1943)
- Puccinia nolletiae Malençon (1936)
- Puccinia nonensis Henn. (1904)
- Puccinia nonerumpens W.T. Dale (1955)
- Puccinia norica Głow. (1892)
- Puccinia notabilis Tracy & Earle (1895)
- Puccinia notha H.S. Jacks. & Holw. (1918)
- Puccinia nothaphoebes J.Y. Zhuang (1990)
- Puccinia nothoscordi H.S. Jacks. & Holw. (1926)
- Puccinia notobasidis Gonz. Frag. (1926)
- Puccinia notopterae Arthur (1918)
- Puccinia novae-zembliae Jørst. (1923)
- Puccinia novopanici Demers, M. Liu & Hambl. (2017)
- Puccinia novozelandica Bubák (1901)
- Puccinia nuda Ellis & Everh. (1887)
- Puccinia nuttallii Ellis & Everh. (1897)
- Puccinia nyasaensis Cummins (1956)
- Puccinia nyasalandica Cummins (1956)

== O ==
- Puccinia oahuensis Ellis & Everh. (1895)
- Puccinia oaxacana Dietel & Holw. (1901)
- Puccinia obducens P. Syd. & Syd. (1902)
- Puccinia obesa P. Syd. & Syd. (1902)
- Puccinia obesiseptata Cummins, M.P. Britton & J.W. Baxter (1969)
- Puccinia obesispora Arthur (1918)
- Puccinia oblata Mains (1939)
- Puccinia obliqua Berk. & M.A. Curtis (1868)
- Puccinia obliquoseptata Vienn.-Bourg. (1958)
- Puccinia obliterata Arthur (1910)
- Puccinia oblongatoides Cummins (1940)
- Puccinia oblongula H.S. Jacks. & Holw. (1926)
- Puccinia obregonensis Pardo-Card. (2001)
- Puccinia obrepta H.S. Jacks. & Holw. (1932)
- Puccinia obscura J. Schröt. (1877)
- Puccinia obscurata Arthur & Holw. (1918)
- Puccinia obscuripora Gjaerum (1985)
- Puccinia obtecta Peck (1873)
- Puccinia obtectella Cummins (1940)
- Puccinia obtusa J. Schröt. (1887)
- Puccinia obtusata G.H. Otth ex E. Fisch. (1898)
- Puccinia obvoluta H.S. Jacks. & Holw. (1926)
- Puccinia ocimi Doidge (1927)
- Puccinia odontolepidis Gonz. Frag. (1918)
- Puccinia oederi A. Blytt (1896)
- Puccinia oedibasidis Ramaz. (1986)
- Puccinia oedipus Cooke (1882)
- Puccinia oedopoda J.Y. Zhuang (1989)
- Puccinia oedospora J.Y. Zhuang (1989)
- Puccinia oenanthes Carestia (1876)
- Puccinia oenanthes-stoloniferae S. Ito ex Tranzschel (1939)
- Puccinia oenotherae Vize (1877)
- Puccinia oerteliana Tranzschel (1923)
- Puccinia offuscata Arthur (1920)
- Puccinia ohsawaensis Kakish. (1980)
- Puccinia okatamaensis S. Ito (1909)
- Puccinia okudairae Hirats. f. & Yoshin. (1935)
- Puccinia oldenlandiae Henn. (1892)
- Puccinia oldenlandiicola Henn. (1908)
- Puccinia oleariae McAlpine (1906)
- Puccinia oliganthae McAlpine (1906)
- Puccinia oliganthicola Jørst. (1960)
- Puccinia oligocarpa Syd., P. Syd. & E.J. Butler (1912)
- Puccinia olyrae-latifoliae Vienn.-Bourg. (1955)
- Puccinia omeiensis F.L. Tai (1973)
- Puccinia omnivora Ellis & Everh. (1895)
- Puccinia oncidii Cummins (1960)
- Puccinia oniwaensis Hirats. f. & S. Sato (1962)
- Puccinia onopordi P. Syd. & Syd. (1902)
- Puccinia onosmaticola Gjaerum & Bahç. (2004)
- Puccinia onosmatis Gjaerum & Bahç. (2003)
- Puccinia opaca Dietel & Holw. (1897)
- Puccinia operculariae (A. Morrison) P. Syd. & Syd. (1902)
- Puccinia operculinae T.S. Ramakr. & Sundaram (1953)
- Puccinia operta Mundk. & Thirum. (1946)
- Puccinia ophiopogonis (Syd. & P. Syd.) Cummins (1937)
- Puccinia opipara Cummins (1941)
- Puccinia opizii Bubák (1902)
- Puccinia oplismeni Syd. & P. Syd. (1906)
- Puccinia opopanacis Ces. (1873)
- Puccinia opposita (Orton) Arthur (1921)
- Puccinia opulenta Speg. (1880)
- Puccinia opuntiae (Magnus) Arthur & Holw. (1925)
- Puccinia orbicula Peck & Clinton (1878)
- Puccinia orbiculata P. Syd. & Syd. (1904)
- Puccinia ordinata H.S. Jacks. & Holw. (1918)
- Puccinia oregonensis Earle (1902)
- Puccinia orellana Syd. (1937)
- Puccinia oreoboli Cummins (1941)
- Puccinia oreogeta Syd. (1937)
- Puccinia oreomyrrhidis G. Cunn. (1923)
- Puccinia oreophila Syd. (1931)
- Puccinia oreophilae Nevod. (1950)
- Puccinia oreoselini (F. Strauss) Körn. (1870)
- Puccinia oreosolenis J.Y. Zhuang (1992)
- Puccinia oriciae J.M. Yen & Gilles (1976)
- Puccinia oritrophii Vanegas-Berrouet & Salazar-Yepes (2019)
- Puccinia ornata Arthur & Holw. (1887)
- Puccinia ornatula Holw. (1907)
- Puccinia ornithogali Hazsl. (1878)
- Puccinia ornithogali-thyrsoidis Dietel (1905)
- Puccinia ortizii Mayor (1914)
- Puccinia ortonii H.S. Jacks. (1918)
- Puccinia oryzopsidis Syd., P. Syd. & E.J. Butler (1907)
- Puccinia osbornii Samuel (1924)
- Puccinia osoyoosensis Savile (1973)
- Puccinia osyridicarpi (Massee) Grove (1916)
- Puccinia otagensis (Linds.) McKenzie & Padamsee (2016)
- Puccinia otaniana Hirats. f. (1967)
- Puccinia otavalensis Berndt (1998)
- Puccinia othonnae Doidge (1927)
- Puccinia othonnoides Berndt, A.R. Wood & E. Uhlmann (2006)
- Puccinia otiophorae P. Syd. & Syd. (1902)
- Puccinia otomeriae Marchal & Steyaert (1929)
- Puccinia otopappi P. Syd. & Syd. (1902)
- Puccinia otopappicola Jørst. (1958)
- Puccinia otostegia Gjaerum (1989)
- Puccinia ottochloae T.S. Ramakr. (1956)
- Puccinia otzeniani Mennicken, W. Maier, Crous & Oberw. (2005)
- Puccinia oudemansii Tranzschel (1904)
- Puccinia ourisiae Dietel & Neger (1897)
- Puccinia ourmiahensis Vienn.-Bourg. (1958)
- Puccinia ovamboensis Mennicken, W. Maier & Oberw. (2005)
- Puccinia oxalidis Dietel & Ellis (1895)
- Puccinia oxyacanthae (S. Ahmad) Savile (1970)
- Puccinia oxypetali Henn. (1899)
- Puccinia oxyriae Fuckel (1875)
- Puccinia oyedaeae Mayor (1914)

== P ==
- Puccinia pachycarpi Kalchbr. & Cooke (1882)
- Puccinia pachycephala Dietel (1906)
- Puccinia pachyderma Wettst. (1887)
- Puccinia pachypes Syd. & P. Syd. (1912)
- Puccinia pachyphloea P. Syd. & Syd. (1903)
- Puccinia pachyspora Dietel (1897)
- Puccinia pacifica Blasdale ex Arthur (1921)
- Puccinia padwickii Cummins (1952)
- Puccinia paederiae (Dietel) Gorlenko (1970)
- Puccinia paederotae Savile (1968)
- Puccinia pagana Arthur (1911)
- Puccinia paihuashanensis Y.C. Wang (1965)
- Puccinia pakistani S. Ahmad (1961)
- Puccinia palicoureae Mains (1935)
- Puccinia paliformis Fuckel (1870)
- Puccinia pallefaciens Dietel & Holw. (1894)
- Puccinia pallens Syd. & P. Syd. (1903)
- Puccinia pallida Tracy (1893)
- Puccinia pallidefaciens Lindr. (1901)
- Puccinia pallidomaculata Ellis & Everh. (1889)
- Puccinia pallor Arthur & Holw. (1918)
- Puccinia palmeri (H.W. Anderson) Dietel & Holw. (1898)
- Puccinia paludosa Plowr. (1889)
- Puccinia pamirica Tranzschel & Erem. (1939)
- Puccinia pammelii (Trel.) Arthur (1905)
- Puccinia pampeana Speg. (1880)
- Puccinia panciciae Picb. (1949)
- Puccinia pangasinensis Syd. (1937)
- Puccinia panici Dietel (1895)
- Puccinia panicicola Arthur (1907)
- Puccinia panici-urvilleani (Dietel & Neger) Demers (2017)
- Puccinia panicophila Speg. (1909)
- Puccinia paniculariae Arthur (1901)
- Puccinia papillifera P. Syd. & Syd. (1904)
- Puccinia pappiana Syd. & P. Syd. (1911)
- Puccinia pappophori Cummins (1956)
- Puccinia papuana Cummins (1941)
- Puccinia paradoxica Ricker (1905)
- Puccinia paraensis Dietel (1908)
- Puccinia paramensis Mayor (1914)
- Puccinia paraphysata Reichert (1921)
- Puccinia parca Arthur (1919)
- Puccinia parianicola Berndt (2012)
- Puccinia parielii Maire (1931)
- Puccinia parilis (Arthur) Arthur (1918)
- Puccinia parkerae Dietel & Holw. (1895)
- Puccinia parksiana Cummins (1935)
- Puccinia parnassiae Arthur (1904)
- Puccinia paronychiae Unamuno (1933)
- Puccinia paroselae Cummins (1941)
- Puccinia parthenices H.S. Jacks. (1922)
- Puccinia pascua Demers, M. Liu & Hambl. (2017)
- Puccinia pasitheae Dietel & Neger (1897)
- Puccinia paspali Tracy & Earle (1895)
- Puccinia paspalicola Arthur (1934)
- Puccinia paspalina Cummins (1945)
- Puccinia passerinii J. Schröt. (1875)
- Puccinia patagonica Speg. (1887)
- Puccinia patriniae Henn. (1900)
- Puccinia patriniae-gibbosae Miura (1913)
- Puccinia patruelis Arthur (1910)
- Puccinia pattersoniae P. Syd. & Syd. (1904)
- Puccinia pattersoniana Arthur (1906)
- Puccinia paulensis Rangel (1918)
- Puccinia paulii Poelt (1961)
- Puccinia paulsenii Syd. & P. Syd. (1919)
- Puccinia paupercula Arthur (1905)
- Puccinia pavoniae Henn. (1900)
- Puccinia pazensis H.C. Greene & Cummins (1958)
- Puccinia pazschkei Dietel (1891)
- Puccinia peckii (De Toni) Kellerm. (1902)
- Puccinia pectiniformis T.S. Ramakr., Sriniv. & Sundaram (1953)
- Puccinia pedatissima G. Cunn. (1923)
- Puccinia pedicularis Thüm. (1878)
- Puccinia pedunculata J. Schröt. (1875)
- Puccinia pegleriana Doidge (1927)
- Puccinia pelargonii (Thüm.) P. Syd. & Syd. (1904)
- Puccinia pelargonii-zonalis Doidge (1927)
- Puccinia pencana P. Syd. & Syd. (1902)
- Puccinia penningtonii P. Syd. & Syd. (1904)
- Puccinia penniseticola J.M. Yen (1971)
- Puccinia penniseti-lanati S. Ahmad (1961)
- Puccinia penstemonis Peck (1885)
- Puccinia pentactina Doidge (1928)
- Puccinia pentadicola Grove (1916)
- Puccinia pentadis Henn. (1895)
- Puccinia pentadis-carneae Wakef. (1916)
- Puccinia pentanisiae Cooke (1882)
- Puccinia peperomiae J.C. Lindq. (1953)
- Puccinia peradeniyae Demers & Castl. (2017)
- Puccinia peraffinis Syd. & P. Syd. (1913)
- Puccinia perasperata J.F. Hennen & Cummins (1973)
- Puccinia pereziae Henn. (1896)
- Puccinia pereziicola Speg. (1909)
- Puccinia perfuncta H.S. Jacks. & Holw. (1932)
- Puccinia peridermiospora (Ellis & Tracy) Arthur (1899)
- Puccinia perincerta H.S. Jacks. & Holw. (1932)
- Puccinia peristrophes Petr. (1954)
- Puccinia perlaevis G. Cunn. (1928)
- Puccinia perminuta Arthur (1907)
- Puccinia permixta Syd. & P. Syd. (1912)
- Puccinia perotidis Cummins (1956)
- Puccinia perscita H.S. Jacks. & Holw. (1932)
- Puccinia persica Wettst. (1887)
- Puccinia persicariae-odoratae P. Zhao & L. Cai (2021)
- Puccinia perspicabilis H.S. Jacks. & Holw. (1932)
- Puccinia pertenuis S. Ito (1909)
- Puccinia pertrita H.S. Jacks. & Holw. (1932)
- Puccinia perundulata Cummins (1960)
- Puccinia pervenusta H.S. Jacks. & Holw. (1932)
- Puccinia pestibilis H.S. Jacks. & Holw. (1932)
- Puccinia petasitis Vestergr. (1909)
- Puccinia petasitis-pendulae Gäum. (1943)
- Puccinia petasitis-poarum Gäum. & Eichhorn (1941)
- Puccinia petasitis-pulchellae Lüdi (1916)
- Puccinia petitianae Gjaerum (1984)
- Puccinia petrakii J.C. Lindq. (1957)
- Puccinia peucedani-alsatici Picb. (1927)
- Puccinia peucedani-austriaci Mayor ex Gäum. (1941)
- Puccinia peucedani-elgonensis Gjaerum (1985)
- Puccinia peucedani-kerstenii Gjaerum (1985)
- Puccinia pfaffiae Viégas (1945)
- Puccinia phaceliae P. Syd., Syd. & Holw. (1902)
- Puccinia phaenospermatis I. Hino & Katum. (1956)
- Puccinia phaeopappi Maire (1905)
- Puccinia phaeopoda Syd. (1931)
- Puccinia phaeospora Kakish. & Y. Ono (1982)
- Puccinia phaeosticta Pat. & Har. (1906)
- Puccinia phellopteri P. Syd. & Syd. (1903)
- Puccinia philibertiae Ellis & Everh. (1895)
- Puccinia philippii Dietel & Neger (1896)
- Puccinia philippinensis Syd. & P. Syd. (1913)
- Puccinia phlogacanthi Syd. & P. Syd. (1911)
- Puccinia phlomidicola T.Z. Liu (2016)
- Puccinia phlomidis Thüm. (1878)
- Puccinia phoebes-hunanensis J.Y. Zhuang (1990)
- Puccinia phragmitis (Schumach.) Tul. (1854)
- Puccinia phrynae Hüseyın & Kirbağ (2003)
- Puccinia phyllachoroidea Speg. (1910)
- Puccinia phyllocladiae Cooke (1882)
- Puccinia phyllostachydis Kusano (1908)
- Puccinia phymatospora Lindr. (1902)
- Puccinia physalidis Peck (1879)
- Puccinia physedrae Syd. (1938)
- Puccinia physospermi Pass. (1877)
- Puccinia physospermopsidis J.Y. Zhuang & S.X. Wei (2000)
- Puccinia physostegiae Peck & Clinton (1878)
- Puccinia picridii Magnus (1911)
- Puccinia picridis-strigosae P. Syd. & Syd. (1902)
- Puccinia picrosiae P. Syd. & Syd. (1902)
- Puccinia picturata H.S. Jacks. & Holw. (1931)
- Puccinia pienaarii Pole-Evans (1916)
- Puccinia pilearum Durrieu (1979)
- Puccinia pileatospora Kakish. & S. Sato (1983)
- Puccinia pilgeriana Henn. (1908)
- Puccinia pimpinellae (F. Strauss) Link (1824)
- Puccinia pimpinellae-bistortae Semadeni (1916)
- Puccinia pimpinellae-brachycarpae Tranzschel & Erem. (1939)
- Puccinia pinaropappi Syd. & P. Syd. (1901)
- Puccinia pindoramae Viégas (1945)
- Puccinia pinguis Dietel (1897)
- Puccinia piperi Ricker (1905)
- Puccinia pipta A.A. Carvalho & J.F. Hennen (2012)
- Puccinia piptadeniae Henn. (1899)
- Puccinia piptocarphae Henn. (1896)
- Puccinia piptochaetii Dietel & Neger (1899)
- Puccinia piqueriae H.S. Jacks. & Holw. (1932)
- Puccinia pistorica Arthur (1911)
- Puccinia pitcairniae Lagerh. (1895)
- Puccinia pittieriana Henn. (1904)
- Puccinia placeae Dietel & Neger (1899)
- Puccinia plagianthi McAlpine (1895)
- Puccinia plagii Maire (1915)
- Puccinia plantaginis Westend. (1861)
- Puccinia platypoda Syd. & P. Syd. (1913)
- Puccinia platyspora (Speg.) H.S. Jacks. & Holw. (1931)
- Puccinia platytaeniae Petr. (1963)
- Puccinia plectranthella Arthur & Cummins (1937)
- Puccinia plectranthi Thüm. (1875)
- Puccinia plectranthicola Gjaerum (2003)
- Puccinia pleurospermi Tranzschel & Woron. (1914)
- Puccinia plicata Kom. (1895)
- Puccinia plucheae (Syd. & P. Syd.) Arthur (1922)
- Puccinia plumasensis J.F. Hennen (1967)
- Puccinia plumbaria Peck (1881)
- Puccinia poae-alpinae Erikss. (1923)
- Puccinia poae-annuae Vienn.-Bourg. (1969)
- Puccinia poae-aposeridis Gäum. & Poelt (1960)
- Puccinia poae-pratensis Miura (1928)
- Puccinia poae-trivialis Bubák (1905)
- Puccinia poarum Nielsen (1877)
- Puccinia poculiformis (Jacq.) Wettst. (1888)
- Puccinia podolepidis McAlpine (1906)
- Puccinia podophylli Schwein. (1822)
- Puccinia podospermi DC. (1805)
- Puccinia pogonarthriae J.C.F. Hopkins (1938)
- Puccinia pogonatheri Petch (1912)
- Puccinia poikilospora Cummins (1940)
- Puccinia pole-evansii Doidge (1927)
- Puccinia polemonii Dietel & Holw. (1893)
- Puccinia polii A.L. Guyot (1938)
- Puccinia polliniae Barclay (1889)
- Puccinia polliniae-imberbis (S. Ito) Hirats. (1937)
- Puccinia polliniae-quadrinervis Dietel (1909)
- Puccinia polliniicola Syd. (1931)
- Puccinia polozhiae Plats (1983)
- Puccinia polycampta Syd. (1924)
- Puccinia polygalae Pazschke (1896)
- Puccinia polygoni-alpini Cruchet & Mayor (1908)
- Puccinia polygoni-amphibii Pers. (1801)
- Puccinia polygonicola F.L. Tai (1947)
- Puccinia polygoni-cyanandri J.Y. Zhuang & S.X. Wei (2000)
- Puccinia polygoni-lapathifolii Liou & Y.C. Wang (1935)
- Puccinia polygoni-sachalinensis Pat. & Har. (1905)
- Puccinia polygoni-sieboldii (Hirats. f. & S. Kaneko) B. Li (1988)
- Puccinia polygoni-weyrichii Miyabe (1931)
- Puccinia polymniae H.S. Jacks. & Holw. (1932)
- Puccinia polypogonis Speg. (1909)
- Puccinia polypogonobia McKenzie (1980)
- Puccinia polysora Underw. (1897)
- Puccinia polystegia Syd. (1922)
- Puccinia ponsae Berndt (1999)
- Puccinia poromera Holw. (1913)
- Puccinia porophylli Henn. (1900)
- Puccinia porphyretica H.S. Jacks. & Holw. (1932)
- Puccinia porphyrogenita M.A. Curtis (1876)
- Puccinia porri (Sowerby) G. Winter (1881)
- Puccinia porteri Peck (1874)
- Puccinia posadensis Sacc. & Trotter (1912)
- Puccinia potosina Cummins, M.P. Britton & J.W. Baxter (1969)
- Puccinia pottsii Doidge (1927)
- Puccinia pounamu G. Cunn. (1923)
- Puccinia pouzolzii Mayor & Terrier (1957)
- Puccinia pozzii Semadeni (1904)
- Puccinia praealta H.S. Jacks. & Holw. (1918)
- Puccinia praeandina Speg. (1909)
- Puccinia praecellens Syd. (1937)
- Puccinia praecox (Bubák) Bubák (1898)
- Puccinia praeculta H.S. Jacks. & Holw. (1932)
- Puccinia praedicabilis H.S. Jacks. & Holw. (1932)
- Puccinia praegracilis Arthur (1907)
- Puccinia praemorsa Dietel & Holw. (1901)
- Puccinia praetermissa Parmelee (1968)
- Puccinia praevara H.S. Jacks. & Holw. (1932)
- Puccinia prainiana Barclay (1891)
- Puccinia pratensis A. Blytt (1896)
- Puccinia premnae Henn. (1902)
- Puccinia prenanthis-purpureae (DC.) Lindr. (1901)
- Puccinia prenanthis-racemosae P. Syd. & Syd. (1902)
- Puccinia prescotti Lindr. (1901)
- Puccinia pretoriensis Doidge (1927)
- Puccinia primulae (DC.) Duby (1830)
- Puccinia princeps Syd. & P. Syd. (1906)
- Puccinia pringlei Peck (1881)
- Puccinia prionosciadii Lindr. (1901)
- Puccinia pritzeliana Henn. (1901)
- Puccinia proba H.S. Jacks. & Holw. (1918)
- Puccinia probabilis Arthur & Cummins (1933)
- Puccinia procera Dietel & Holw. (1893)
- Puccinia procerula H.S. Jacks. & Holw. (1932)
- Puccinia proluviosa H.S. Jacks. & Holw. (1932)
- Puccinia promatensis Berndt (1999)
- Puccinia propinqua Syd., P. Syd. & E.J. Butler (1907)
- Puccinia proserpinacae Farl. (1883)
- Puccinia prosopidis Bieberd., Mefferd & Blackmon (1955)
- Puccinia prospera Arthur (1919)
- Puccinia proximella Syd. & P. Syd. (1912)
- Puccinia pryorii Petr. (1959)
- Puccinia psammochloae Y.C. Wang (1965)
- Puccinia psephelli Uljan. (1962)
- Puccinia pseudechinolaenae Gjaerum (1983)
- Puccinia pseudoatra Cummins (1942)
- Puccinia pseudocesatii Cummins (1953)
- Puccinia pseudocymopteri Holw. (1913)
- Puccinia pseudodigitata M. Liu & Hambl. (2019)
- Puccinia pseudomenthae G. Cunn. (1930)
- Puccinia pseudomesnieriana M. Liu & Hambl. (2019)
- Puccinia pseudomyuri Kleb. (1913)
- Puccinia pseudophacospora Speg. (1922)
- Puccinia pseudostriiformis M. Abbasi, Hedjar. & M. Scholler (2005)
- Puccinia psoraleae Zaprom. (1928)
- Puccinia psoroderma Lindr. (1901)
- Puccinia psychotriae Henn. (1905)
- Puccinia ptarmicae P. Karst. (1878)
- Puccinia ptarmicae-caricis Zwetko (1993)
- Puccinia pternopetali J.Y. Zhuang (1986)
- Puccinia pterocauli Henn. (1896)
- Puccinia pteroniae Mennicken & Oberw. (2004)
- Puccinia ptilosiae Bubák (1906)
- Puccinia ptychotidis Vienn.-Bourg. & Ponchet (1982)
- Puccinia pucarae Berndt (2002)
- Puccinia pugiensis F.L. Tai (1965)
- Puccinia puiggarii (Speg.) P. Syd. & Syd. (1904)
- Puccinia pulchella Peck (1873)
- Puccinia pulchra Jørst. (1959)
- Puccinia pulverulenta Grev. (1824)
- Puccinia pulvillulata Lindr. (1901)
- Puccinia pulvinata Rabenh. (1871)
- Puccinia pumilae-coronatae H.K.G. Paul (1929)
- Puccinia punctata Link (1816)
- Puccinia punctoidea P. Syd. & Syd. (1902)
- Puccinia puntana J.C. Lindq. (1952)
- Puccinia puritanica Cummins (1941)
- Puccinia purpurea Cooke (1876)
- Puccinia purpusii Henn. (1898)
- Puccinia pusilla Syd. & P. Syd. (1906)
- Puccinia puspa Racib. (1909)
- Puccinia puta H.S. Jacks. & Holw. ex F. Kern, Thurst. & Whetzel (1933)
- Puccinia puttemansii Henn. (1902)
- Puccinia puyana Syd. (1939)
- Puccinia pycnothelis Syd. (1930)
- Puccinia pygmaea Erikss. (1895)
- Puccinia pyrenaea Durrieu (1965)
- Puccinia pyrolae Cooke (1862)
- Puccinia pyrrhopappi P. Syd. & Syd. (1902)

== Q ==
- Puccinia quillensis Dietel & Neger (1899)
- Puccinia quitensis Berndt (1998)

== R ==
- Puccinia rameliana H.S. Jacks. & Holw. (1927)
- Puccinia ramelianoides Jørst. (1956)
- Puccinia ranulipes Doidge (1927)
- Puccinia ranunculi A. Blytt (1882)
- Puccinia ranunculi-falcati S. Ahmad (1954)
- Puccinia rapipes Berndt & E. Uhlmann (2006)
- Puccinia rara McKenzie (1980)
- Puccinia rata H.S. Jacks. & Holw. (1918)
- Puccinia raunkiaerii Ferd. & Winge (1908)
- Puccinia rautahi G. Cunn. (1930)
- Puccinia rayssiae Savchenko, V.P. Heluta, Wasser & Nevo (2014)
- Puccinia reaumuriae Magnus (1899)
- Puccinia recedens P. Syd. & Syd. (1902)
- Puccinia rechingeri Petr. (1963)
- Puccinia rechingeriana Petr. (1968)
- Puccinia recondita Roberge ex Desm. (1857)
- Puccinia redempta H.S. Jacks. (1922)
- Puccinia redfieldiae Tracy (1893)
- Puccinia reichei Dietel & Neger (1897)
- Puccinia reidii G. Cunn. (1923)
- Puccinia remireae J.M. Yen (1973)
- Puccinia remoti-montis Durrieu (1965)
- Puccinia repentina H.S. Jacks. & Holw. (1931)
- Puccinia retecta Syd. & P. Syd. (1903)
- Puccinia retifera Lindr. (1902)
- Puccinia reverdattoana Lavrov (1926)
- Puccinia reynoldsii Thaung (2011)
- Puccinia rhaetica E. Fisch. (1899)
- Puccinia rhagadioli (Pass.) P. Syd. & Syd. (1902)
- Puccinia rhagodiae (Cooke & Massee) McTaggart & R.G. Shivas (2017)
- Puccinia rhapontici P. Syd. & Syd. (1902)
- Puccinia rhei-palmati B. Li (1988)
- Puccinia rhei-undulati Hirats. f. (1935)
- Puccinia rhodosensis Gjærum (2014)
- Puccinia rhynchosporae Syd. & P. Syd. (1913)
- Puccinia rhynchosporae-candidae Gjaerum (1990)
- Puccinia rhynchosporicola Speg. (1925)
- Puccinia rhynchosporiphila Gjaerum (1990)
- Puccinia rhyssostelmatis Speg. (1902)
- Puccinia rhytidioderma Berndt (2007)
- Puccinia rhytismoides Johanson (1886)
- Puccinia ribis DC. (1805)
- Puccinia ribis-caricis Kleb. (1907)
- Puccinia ribis-digitatae Gäum. (1959)
- Puccinia ribis-diversicoloris Gäum. (1939)
- Puccinia ribis-japonici Henn. (1902)
- Puccinia ribis-nigri-acutae Kleb. (1896)
- Puccinia richardsonii P. Syd. & Syd. (1902)
- Puccinia rigensis Bucholtz (1905)
- Puccinia rimosa (Link) G. Winter (1880)
- Puccinia riobambensis Jørst. (1959)
- Puccinia riparia Holw. (1904)
- Puccinia ripulae Mains (1939)
- Puccinia rivalis Gäum. (1940)
- Puccinia rivinae Speg. (1909)
- Puccinia rocherpaniana Mennicken & Oberw. (2004)
- Puccinia rodriguezii Unamuno (1941)
- Puccinia roegneriae J.Y. Zhuang & S.X. Wei (1993)
- Puccinia roesteliiformis Lagerh. (1902)
- Puccinia romagnoliana Maire & Sacc. (1903)
- Puccinia romanzoffiae H.S. Jacks. (1918)
- Puccinia rompelii Magnus (1907)
- Puccinia roscoeae Barclay (1889)
- Puccinia roseanae Arthur (1918)
- Puccinia rosenii Arthur (1918)
- Puccinia rossiana (Sacc.) Lagerh. (1890)
- Puccinia rossii Bubák (1906)
- Puccinia rostkoviae Speg. (1887)
- Puccinia rostrata Cooke (1876)
- Puccinia rottboelliae P. Syd. & Syd. (1904)
- Puccinia rouliniae Henn. (1896)
- Puccinia rubefaciens Johanson (1886)
- Puccinia rubiae-tataricae Syd. & P. Syd. (1913)
- Puccinia rubiicola P. Syd. & Syd. (1902)
- Puccinia rubiivora Magnus (1901)
- Puccinia rubricans Holw. (1904)
- Puccinia ruderaria H.S. Jacks. & Holw. (1932)
- Puccinia ruebelii Volkart (1912)
- Puccinia ruelliae Lagerh. (1895)
- Puccinia ruelliae-bourgaei Dietel & Holw. (1901)
- Puccinia ruelliae-parviflorae G.F. Laundon (1963)
- Puccinia ruelliicola J.C. Lindq. (1952)
- Puccinia rufescens Dietel & Holw. (1893)
- Puccinia rufipes Dietel (1902)
- Puccinia rugispora D.E. Gardner (1990)
- Puccinia rugosa J.S. Billings (1871)
- Puccinia rugulosa Tranzschel (1892)
- Puccinia ruizensis Mayor (1914)
- Puccinia rumicicola Gonz. Frag. (1914)
- Puccinia rumicis-scutati (DC.) G. Winter (1881)
- Puccinia rupestris Juel (1893)
- Puccinia russa Arthur & Cummins (1933)
- Puccinia rutainsulara D.E. Gardner (1990)
- Puccinia rydbergii Garrett (1914)
- Puccinia rytzii Gäum. & Jaag (1935)

== S ==
- Puccinia saccardoi F. Ludw. (1889)
- Puccinia saepta Jørst. (1959)
- Puccinia salebrata H.S. Jacks. & Holw. (1932)
- Puccinia salihae Kirbağ & Aime (2011)
- Puccinia salinarum Vestergr. (1909)
- Puccinia saltensis Cummins (1956)
- Puccinia salviae Unger (1836)
- Puccinia salviae-interruptae Maire (1937)
- Puccinia salviae-lanceolatae Bubák (1902)
- Puccinia salviae-runcinatae Doidge (1927)
- Puccinia salviae-stipae Kleb. (1904)
- Puccinia salviicola Dietel & Holw. (1897)
- Puccinia sambuci (Schwein.) Arthur
- Puccinia samperi Mayor (1914)
- Puccinia sana H.S. Jacks. & Holw. (1932)
- Puccinia sanctae-balmae Massenot (1958)
- Puccinia sanguinolenta Henn. (1896)
- Puccinia saniculae Grev. (1824)
- Puccinia saniniensis Magnus (1900)
- Puccinia santolinae Magnus (1908)
- Puccinia saposhnikoviae P. Zhao & L. Cai (2021)
- Puccinia sarachae Mayor (1914)
- Puccinia sasae Kusano (1908)
- Puccinia satarensis P.B. Chavan & Bakare (1973)
- Puccinia saturejae Cummins (1945)
- Puccinia satyrii P. Syd. & Syd. (1903)
- Puccinia saussureae Thüm. (1878)
- Puccinia saussureae-acrophyllae Y.C. Wang (1949)
- Puccinia saussureae-alpinae Lindr. (1904)
- Puccinia saussureae-ussuriensis Liou & Y.C. Wang (1935)
- Puccinia saxifragae Schltdl. (1824)
- Puccinia saxifragae-ciliatae Barclay (1889)
- Puccinia saxifragae-gei Savile (1974)
- Puccinia saxifragae-tricuspidatae Henn. (1897)
- Puccinia scabiosae-sempervirentis Hasler (1930)
- Puccinia scabrida F. He & Kakish. (1993)
- Puccinia scaevolincola Petr. (1953)
- Puccinia scaliana Syd. & P. Syd. (1901)
- Puccinia scandica Johanson (1886)
- Puccinia scandicicola Annal. (1981)
- Puccinia scharifii Petr. (1953)
- Puccinia schedonnardi Kellerm. & Swingle (1888)
- Puccinia schemahensis Uljan. (1962)
- Puccinia schileana Speg. (1880)
- Puccinia schimperiana Syd. & P. Syd. (1910)
- Puccinia schirajewskii Tranzschel (1911)
- Puccinia schistocarphae H.S. Jacks. & Holw. (1918)
- Puccinia schizocodonis Pat. (1887)
- Puccinia schizonepetae Tranzschel (1913)
- Puccinia schlechteri Henn. (1895)
- Puccinia schmidtiana Dietel (1896)
- Puccinia schoenanthi Cummins & A.L. Guyot (1971)
- Puccinia schoenoxiphii Doidge (1939)
- Puccinia schoenus G. Cunn. (1930)
- Puccinia schottmuelleri Henn. (1893)
- Puccinia schroeteri Pass. (1875)
- Puccinia schroeteriana Kleb. (1895)
- Puccinia schultesianthi Pardo, Gallo, Salazar & Buriticá (2011)
- Puccinia schweinfurthii (Henn.) Magnus (1892)
- Puccinia scillae Linh. (1885)
- Puccinia scillae-rubrae Cruchet (1917)
- Puccinia scimitriformis Cummins (1949)
- Puccinia sciophila Syd. (1939)
- Puccinia scirpi DC. (1805)
- Puccinia scirpi-grossi Syd. (1939)
- Puccinia scirpi-ternatani Hirats. f. (1941)
- Puccinia scleriae (Pazschke) Arthur (1917)
- Puccinia scleriae-dregeanae Doidge (1939)
- Puccinia scleriicola Arthur (1915)
- Puccinia sclerolaenae Massee (1910)
- Puccinia scleropogonis Cummins (1964)
- Puccinia scolymi P. Syd. & Syd. (1902)
- Puccinia scorodoprasi Lind (1915)
- Puccinia scorzonerae (Schumach.) Juel (1896)
- Puccinia scorzonerae-limnophilae Alé-Agha (1985)
- Puccinia scribneriana Arthur (1919)
- Puccinia scutellariae D.M. Hend. (1969)
- Puccinia scutiae J.C. Lindq. (1978)
- Puccinia seaveriana Arthur (1922)
- Puccinia sebastianiae Syd. & P. Syd. (1910)
- Puccinia sedi Körn. (1881)
- Puccinia sedi-triseti Dupias (1972)
- Puccinia seijoensis Hirats. f. & S. Sato (1960)
- Puccinia sejuncta Syd. & P. Syd. (1903)
- Puccinia selini-carvifoliae Săvul. (1940)
- Puccinia semadenii Gäum. (1941)
- Puccinia semibarbatae T. Osborn & Samuel (1930)
- Puccinia semiinsculpta Arthur (1905)
- Puccinia semiloculata G.F. Laundon (1963)
- Puccinia semota H.S. Jacks. & Holw. (1918)
- Puccinia senecionicola Arthur (1905)
- Puccinia senecionis-acutiformis Hasler, Mayor & Cruchet (1922)
- Puccinia senecionis-ochrocarpi Bacc. (1917)
- Puccinia senecionis-scandentis Lindr. (1904)
- Puccinia senilis Arthur (1920)
- Puccinia seorsa H.S. Jacks. & Holw. (1932)
- Puccinia separabilis J.C. Lindq. (1958)
- Puccinia seposita Cummins (1949)
- Puccinia septentrionalis Juel (1895)
- Puccinia sepulta Berk. & M.A. Curtis (1860)
- Puccinia seriata P. Syd. & Syd. (1902)
- Puccinia seriphidii Fahrend. (1941)
- Puccinia serjaniae Ellis & Everh. (1897)
- Puccinia serpylli Lindr. (1904)
- Puccinia serratulae Thüm. (1880)
- Puccinia serratulae-cerinthifoliae Rayss (1937)
- Puccinia serratulae-oligocephalae P. Syd. & Syd. (1902)
- Puccinia serratulae-pinnatifidae Gonz. Frag. (1918)
- Puccinia serrulatae J.C. Lindq. (1958)
- Puccinia seseleos A.L. Guyot (1951)
- Puccinia sesleriae Reichardt (1877)
- Puccinia sessilis J. Schröt. (1870)
- Puccinia setariae Dietel & Holw. (1897)
- Puccinia setariae-forbesianae F.L. Tai (1965)
- Puccinia setariae-longisetae Wakef. & Hansf. (1949)
- Puccinia setariae-viridis Dietel (1918)
- Puccinia seymeriae Burrill (1884)
- Puccinia seymouriana Arthur (1902)
- Puccinia seymourii Lindr. (1901)
- Puccinia sherardiana Körn. (1877)
- Puccinia shikotsuensis S. Ito (1943)
- Puccinia shiraiana P. Syd. (1899)
- Puccinia sibirica Tranzschel (1911)
- Puccinia sibutiana Har. & Pat. (1909)
- Puccinia sidalceae Holw. (1907)
- Puccinia sierrensis Cummins (1967)
- Puccinia sieversiae Arthur (1904)
- Puccinia sii-falcariae (Pers.) J. Schröt. (1887)
- Puccinia sikokiana Dietel (1905)
- Puccinia silenicola Sousa da Câmara, Oliveira & Luz (1940)
- Puccinia silenigena S.H. Iqbal, Afshan & Khalid (2009)
- Puccinia sileris W. Voss (1876)
- Puccinia silphii Schwein. (1832)
- Puccinia silvaticella Arthur & Cummins (1933)
- Puccinia simasii Rangel (1917)
- Puccinia similis Ellis & Everh. (1898)
- Puccinia simillima Arthur (1902)
- Puccinia sinaloana Cummins, M.P. Britton & J.W. Baxter (1969)
- Puccinia sinarundinariae J.Y. Zhuang & S.X. Wei (1992)
- Puccinia sinarundinariicola J.Y. Zhuang & S.X. Wei (1999)
- Puccinia singeri J.C. Lindq. (1952)
- Puccinia singularis Magnus (1890)
- Puccinia sinica Syd. (1929)
- Puccinia sinicensis Cummins (1951)
- Puccinia sinkiangensis Y.C. Wang (1965)
- Puccinia sinoborealis S.X. Wei & Y.C. Wang (1987)
- Puccinia sjuzevii Tranzschel & Erem. (1939)
- Puccinia skottsbergii Jørst. (1957)
- Puccinia smilacearum-festucae Mayor (1922)
- Puccinia smilacinae Syd. & P. Syd. (1914)
- Puccinia smilacis Schwein. (1822)
- Puccinia smilacis-chinae Henn. (1901)
- Puccinia smilacis-persicae Alé-Agha (1989)
- Puccinia smilacis-sempervirentis Y.C. Wang (1938)
- Puccinia smilacis-sieboldii Hirats. f. (1942)
- Puccinia smyrnii Biv. (1816)
- Puccinia sogdiana Kom. (1895)
- Puccinia solanacearum Sacc. & P. Syd. (1899)
- Puccinia solanicola Mayor (1914)
- Puccinia solani-giganteae T.S. Ramakr. & K. Ramakr. (1947)
- Puccinia solanina Speg. (1912)
- Puccinia solanita (Schwein.) Arthur (1922)
- Puccinia solani-tristis Henn. (1896)
- Puccinia soldanellae (DC.) Fuckel (1875)
- Puccinia soledadensis Mayor (1914)
- Puccinia solheimii Cummins (1940)
- Puccinia solidaginicola Dietel (1906)
- Puccinia solidaginis Peck (1884)
- Puccinia solidaginis-microglossae Dietel (1906)
- Puccinia solidaginis-mollis Dietel (1906)
- Puccinia solidipes H.S. Jacks. & Holw. (1918)
- Puccinia solitaria P. Syd. & Syd. (1903)
- Puccinia solmsii (Kuntze) Sacc. & P. Syd. (1899)
- Puccinia sommieriana Sacc. (1913)
- Puccinia somsii Henn. (1900)
- Puccinia sonchina P. Syd. & Syd. (1903)
- Puccinia sonchi-oleracei P. Zhao & L. Cai (2021)
- Puccinia songarica Jacz. (1900)
- Puccinia sonidensis T.Z. Liu (2015)
- Puccinia sonorae Parmelee (1969)
- Puccinia sonorica Cummins & S.M. Husain (1966)
- Puccinia sorghi Schwein. (1832)
- Puccinia sparganioidis Ellis & Barthol. (1896)
- Puccinia spathyemae Miura ex Hirats. f. (1959)
- Puccinia spatiosa F. Kern (1917)
- Puccinia speciosa Y. Ono & Ishimiya (2001)
- Puccinia spegazziniana De Toni (1888)
- Puccinia spegazziniella Sacc. & Traverso (1911)
- Puccinia sphacelicola H.S. Jacks. & Holw. (1932)
- Puccinia sphaeralceae Ellis & Everh. (1897)
- Puccinia sphaeralceoides Cummins (1952)
- Puccinia sphaeroidea Henn. (1903)
- Puccinia sphaeromeriae Fahrend. (1941)
- Puccinia sphaerospora Syd., P. Syd. & Henn. (1903)
- Puccinia sphalerocondra Lindr. (1902)
- Puccinia sphenica Arthur (1911)
- Puccinia sphenospora P. Syd. & Syd. (1904)
- Puccinia spicae-venti Bucholtz (1905)
- Puccinia spigeliae Syd. & P. Syd. (1916)
- Puccinia spilanthicola Mayor (1914)
- Puccinia spilanthis Henn. (1892)
- Puccinia spilogena Lindr. (1901)
- Puccinia spinulosa Jørst. (1957)
- Puccinia spiranthicola Cummins (1974)
- Puccinia splendens Vize (1878)
- Puccinia spongiosa Berk. & Broome (1873)
- Puccinia sporoboli Arthur (1884)
- Puccinia sporoboli-arabici Afshan, Berndt, Khalid & Niazi (2008)
- Puccinia sporoboli-coromandeliani Afshan, Khalid & Niazi (2010)
- Puccinia stachydis DC. (1805)
- Puccinia stakmanii Presley (1943)
- Puccinia stapfiana Petr. (1942)
- Puccinia stapfiolae Mundk. & Thirum. (1946)
- Puccinia stauntoniae Tranzschel & Dietel (1930)
- Puccinia steinmanniae Dietel & Neger (1897)
- Puccinia steiractiniae H.S. Jacks. & Holw. (1932)
- Puccinia stellariicola Cummins (1951)
- Puccinia stellenboschiana Van der Byl (1928)
- Puccinia stenandrii Dietel & Neger (1896)
- Puccinia stenomessi Jørst. (1956)
- Puccinia stenospora J.Y. Zhuang & S.X. Wei (1999)
- Puccinia stenotaphri (Syd. & P. Syd.) Cummins (1945)
- Puccinia stenotaphricola J. Walker (1988)
- Puccinia stenothecae A.L. Guyot (1942)
- Puccinia stephanachnes Z.M. Cao & Z.Qi Li (2000)
- Puccinia stephanomeriae P. Syd. & Syd. (1902)
- Puccinia stichosora Dietel (1905)
- Puccinia stipae Arthur (1884)
- Puccinia stipae-sibiricae S. Ito (1909)
- Puccinia stipicida Speg. (1925)
- Puccinia stipicola Speg. (1925)
- Puccinia stipina Tranzschel ex Kleb. (1913)
- Puccinia stizolophi P. Syd. & Syd. (1902)
- Puccinia stobaeae MacOwan (1882)
- Puccinia stojanovii Hinkova (1961)
- Puccinia stonemaniae Syd., P. Syd. & Pole-Evans (1912)
- Puccinia stowardii Har. (1915)
- Puccinia straminea Dietel (1899)
- Puccinia streptanthi Höhn. (1909)
- Puccinia striatifera J.W. Baxter (1953)
- Puccinia striatospora Peck (1913)
- Puccinia striatula Peck (1883)
- Puccinia striiformis Westend. (1854)
- Puccinia striiformoides M. Abbasi, Hedjar. & M. Scholler (2005)
- Puccinia striolata (Speg.) Arthur & J.R. Johnst. (1918)
- Puccinia stromatica Berk. & M.A. Curtis (1874)
- Puccinia stromatifera J.F. Hennen, León-Gall. & Cummins (1972)
- Puccinia stuckertii Speg. (1899)
- Puccinia stylidii McAlpine (1906)
- Puccinia suaveolens (Pers.) Rostr. (1874)
- Puccinia subandina Speg. (1902)
- Puccinia subaquila H.S. Jacks. & Holw. (1932)
- Puccinia subcentripora Arthur & Cummins (1936)
- Puccinia subcircinata Ellis & Everh. (1887)
- Puccinia subcollapsa Ellis (1893)
- Puccinia subcoronata Henn. (1895)
- Puccinia subdecora Syd., P. Syd. & Holw. (1903)
- Puccinia subdigitata Arthur & Holw. (1918)
- Puccinia subepidermalis Afshan, Khalid & S.H. Iqbal (2009)
- Puccinia subglobosa Dietel & Holw. (1901)
- Puccinia subhyalina Tranzschel (1939)
- Puccinia subindumentana Berndt (2006)
- Puccinia subita H.S. Jacks. & Holw. (1932)
- Puccinia sublesta Cummins (1937)
- Puccinia subnitens Dietel (1895)
- Puccinia substerilis Ellis & Everh. (1895)
- Puccinia substriata Ellis & Barthol. (1897)
- Puccinia subtegulanea Cummins (1939)
- Puccinia subtilipes Speg. (1922)
- Puccinia subtropica J.C. Lindq. (1958)
- Puccinia suifunensis Tranzschel (1939)
- Puccinia suksdorfii Ellis & Everh. (1892)
- Puccinia superior (Arthur) H.S. Jacks. (1928)
- Puccinia suzutake Kakish. & S. Sato (1981)
- Puccinia svendsenii Lindr. (1901)
- Puccinia swertiae G. Winter (1881)
- Puccinia sydowiana Zopf (1880)
- Puccinia symphoricarpi Harkn. (1884)
- Puccinia synedrellae Henn. (1898)
- Puccinia synthyridis Ellis & Everh. (1900)
- Puccinia syriaca P. Syd. & Syd. (1902)
- Puccinia szechuanensis Jørst. (1959)

== T ==
- Puccinia tabernaemontanae vBerk. & Broome (1873)
- Puccinia taeniatheri M. Abbasi & Hedjar. (2021)
- Puccinia tagana Maire (1917)
- Puccinia tagananensis Magnus (1901)
- Puccinia taganesuge Miura (1938)
- Puccinia tageticola Dietel & Holw. (1897)
- Puccinia tahensis Tranzschel (1939)
- Puccinia taibaiana B. Li (1988)
- Puccinia taihaensis Hirats. f. & Hashioka (1935)
- Puccinia taiwaniana Hirats. f. & Hashioka (1935)
- Puccinia takikibicola Morim. (1959)
- Puccinia taliensis F.L. Tai (1947)
- Puccinia tanaceti DC. (1805)
- Puccinia tandaaiensis J.C.F. Hopkins (1938)
- Puccinia tandilensis J.C. Lindq. (1963)
- Puccinia tangkuensis Liou & Y.C. Wang (1935)
- Puccinia tararua G. Cunn. (1923)
- Puccinia taraxaci-bithynici Maire (1906)
- Puccinia taraxaci-serotini Picb. (1927)
- Puccinia tardissima Garrett (1914)
- Puccinia tarennicola Kakish. & Tak. Kobay. (1994)
- Puccinia tarrii Cummins & S.M. Husain (1966)
- Puccinia tasmanica Dietel (1903)
- Puccinia tassadiae P. Syd. & Syd. (1903)
- Puccinia tatarica Tranzschel (1904)
- Puccinia tatarinovii Kom. & Tranzschel (1939)
- Puccinia tatrensis Z. Urb. (1948)
- Puccinia taurica Tranzschel & Erem. (1939)
- Puccinia taygetea Maire (1940)
- Puccinia taylorii Balf.-Browne (1955)
- Puccinia tecleae Pass. (1875)
- Puccinia tecta Ellis & Barthol. (1896)
- Puccinia tekapo McNabb (1962)
- Puccinia telimutans Otálora & Berndt (2018)
- Puccinia tendae Gäum. (1953)
- Puccinia tenella I. Hino & Katum. (1960)
- Puccinia tenuis (Schwein.) Burrill (1884)
- Puccinia tenuispora McAlpine (1906)
- Puccinia tepperi F. Ludw. (1892)
- Puccinia terebinthacei Azbukina & Zenkova (1966)
- Puccinia terrieri Gäum. (1941)
- Puccinia tetradeniae Gjaerum (1986)
- Puccinia tetragoniae McAlpine (1895)
- Puccinia tetramerii Seym. (1896)
- Puccinia tetranthi Syd. & P. Syd. (1919)
- Puccinia tetuanensis A.L. Guyot (1963)
- Puccinia teucrii Biv. (1815)
- Puccinia teucriicola Katajev (1951)e
- Puccinia thaliae Dietel (1899)
- Puccinia thalictri-finetii P. Zhao & L. Cai (2021)
- Puccinia thalictri-minoris P. Zhao & L. Cai (2021)
- Puccinia thelypodii Cummins (1939)
- Puccinia themedae Hirats. f. (1942)
- Puccinia thesii (Desv.) Chaillet (1830)
- Puccinia thesiicola Jørst. (1957)
- Puccinia thesii-decurrentis (Henn.) Dietel (1908)
- Puccinia thibetana J.Y. Zhuang (1995)
- Puccinia thiensis B. Huguenin (1968)
- Puccinia thlaspeos Ficinus & C. Schub. (1823)
- Puccinia thomasiana T.S. Ramakr. & K. Ramakr. (1948)
- Puccinia thomasii Gäum. (1941)
- Puccinia thompsonii H.H. Hume (1900)
- Puccinia thuemeniana W. Voss (1877)
- Puccinia thuemenii McAlpine (1906)
- Puccinia thunbergiae Cooke (1882)
- Puccinia thunbergiae-alatae Henn. (1895)
- Puccinia thwaitesii Berk. (1873)
- Puccinia thymi (Fuckel) P. Karst. (1884)
- Puccinia tianguensis Berndt & F.O. Freire (2004)
- Puccinia tianshanica J.Y. Zhuang & S.X. Wei (2000)
- Puccinia tiarellae Peck (1873)
- Puccinia tiarellicola Hirats. f. (1955)
- Puccinia tibetica M.M. Chen (1982)
- Puccinia tiflisensis Petr. (1940)
- Puccinia tiliaefolia T.S. Ramakr. & Sundaram (1955)
- Puccinia tillandsiae Cummins & Pollack (1974)
- Puccinia tiritea G. Cunn. (1923)
- Puccinia tirolensis Zwetko (1993)
- Puccinia tithoniae Dietel & Holw. (1897)
- Puccinia tjibodensis Gäum. (1922)
- Puccinia toa G. Cunn. (1930)
- Puccinia togashiana Hirats. f. (1935)
- Puccinia tokubuchii S. Ito (1943)
- Puccinia tokunagae S. Ito & Kawai (1931)
- Puccinia tokyensis P. Syd. & Syd. (1902)
- Puccinia tolimensis Mayor (1913)
- Puccinia tomantheae Teterevn.-Babajan (1948)
- Puccinia tomatillo Jørst. (1958)
- Puccinia tombeana Gäum. & Terrier (1951)
- Puccinia tomipara Trel. (1883)
- Puccinia tonduziana Speg. (1918)
- Puccinia toreniae Racib. (1900)
- Puccinia tornata Arthur & Holw. (1925)
- Puccinia torosa Thüm. (1881)
- Puccinia tossoensis Tokun. & Kawai (1931)
- Puccinia tosta Arthur (1902)
- Puccinia tottoriensis Hirats. (1934)
- Puccinia tournefortiae H.S. Jacks. & Holw. (1931)
- Puccinia tournefortiicola Speg. (1922)
- Puccinia toyohirensis Hirats. (1939)
- Puccinia trabutii Roum. & Sacc. (1881)
- Puccinia trachyderma Syd. (1935)
- Puccinia trachypogonicola Gjaerum (1988)
- Puccinia trachypogonis Speg. (1909)
- Puccinia trachytela Syd. (1926)
- Puccinia tracyi Sacc. & P. Syd. (1899)
- Puccinia tragiae Cooke (1882)
- Puccinia transvaalensis Doidge (1927)
- Puccinia tranzscheliana I.E. Brezhnev (1949)
- Puccinia trautvetteriae P. Syd., Syd. & Holw. (1903)
- Puccinia traversoana P. Syd. & Syd. (1904)
- Puccinia trebouxii Syd. & P. Syd. (1912)
- Puccinia treleasiana Pazschke (1892)
- Puccinia tremandrae Berk. (1873)
- Puccinia triannulata (Berk. & M.A. Curtis) H.S. Jacks. (1922)
- Puccinia trichloridis Speg. (1909)
- Puccinia tricholepidis Syd. (1938)
- Puccinia trichopterygicola Gjaerum (1988)
- Puccinia trichopterygiphila Gjaerum (1988)
- Puccinia tridacis Arthur (1906)
- Puccinia trientalis (Tranzschel) House (1921)
- Puccinia trifoliatae Ellis & Everh. (1895)
- Puccinia triniae Gäum. (1933)
- Puccinia triodiae Ellis & Barthol. (1896)
- Puccinia tripsaci Dietel & Holw. (1897)
- Puccinia tripsacicola Cummins (1952)
- Puccinia triptilii Mont. (1854)
- Puccinia triraphidis Gjaerum (1988)
- Puccinia tristachyae Doidge (1927)
- Puccinia triticorum Speg. (1902)
- Puccinia triumfettae Dietel & Holw. (1897)
- Puccinia trixitis (F. Kern & Kellerm.) Arthur (1918)
- Puccinia troglodytes Lindr. (1901)
- Puccinia trollii P. Karst. (1866)
- Puccinia troximontis Peck (1881)
- Puccinia tshujensis Murashk. (1925)
- Puccinia tsinlingensis Y.C. Wang (1965)
- Puccinia tuberculans Ellis & Everh. (1893)
- Puccinia tuberculata Körn. (1875)
- Puccinia tuberosa Jing X. Ji & Kakish. (2021)
- Puccinia tucumanensis Arthur (1915)
- Puccinia tulipae J. Schröt. (1875)
- Puccinia tumamocensis Arthur (1915)
- Puccinia tumida Grev. (1824)
- Puccinia tumidipes Peck (1885)
- Puccinia tunuyanensis J.C. Lindq. (1949)
- Puccinia tupistrae L. Guo (1989)
- Puccinia turgenica Schmied. (1967)
- Puccinia turgida P. Syd. & Syd. (1902)
- Puccinia turgidipes H.S. Jacks. (1922)
- Puccinia turrita Arthur (1902)
- Puccinia tuyutensis Speg. (1881)
- Puccinia tweediana T.S. Ramakr. & K. Ramakr. (1948)
- Puccinia typhae Kalchbr. (1864)
- Puccinia tyrimni Gonz. Frag. (1918)

== U ==
- Puccinia ugandae Cummins (1943)
- Puccinia ugandana Cummins (1943)
- Puccinia uleana Henn. (1895)
- Puccinia uliginiphila Speg. (1925)
- Puccinia uliginosa Juel (1894)
- Puccinia umbilici Guépin (1830)
- Puccinia umbilicicola Gjaerum & Bahç. (2003)
- Puccinia unamunoi Gonz. Frag. (1920)
- Puccinia unciniae Jørst. (1960)
- Puccinia unciniarum Dietel & Neger (1896)
- Puccinia undulitunicata J.Y. Zhuang & Y.C. Wang (1985)
- Puccinia unica Holw. (1915)
- Puccinia unicolor Arthur (1918)
- Puccinia uniporula Orton (1912)
- Puccinia universalis Arthur (1908)
- Puccinia uralensis Tranzschel (1891)
- Puccinia urbaniana Henn. (1898)
- Puccinia urbanii Savile (1974)
- Puccinia urochloae Perd.-Sánch. & M. Piepenbr. (2008)
- Puccinia ursiniae R.G. Shivas (1991)
- Puccinia urticae Barclay (1889)
- Puccinia urticae-austroalpinae Mayor (1953)
- Puccinia urticae-caricis Kleb. (1899)
- Puccinia urticae-elatae Hasler (1945)
- Puccinia urticae-ferrugineae Gäum. (1943)
- Puccinia urticae-frigidae Hasler (1921)
- Puccinia urticae-pilosae Hasler (1921)
- Puccinia urticae-umbrosae Hasler (1945)
- Puccinia urticae-xiphioidis Dupias (1958)
- Puccinia urticata (Link) F. Kern (1917)
- Puccinia uruguayensis Speg. (1925)
- Puccinia ustalis Berk. (1854)
- Puccinia usteri Dietel (1907)
- Puccinia utahensis Garrett (1906)
- Puccinia uzbekistana Gjaerum (1982)

== V ==
- Puccinia vacua Dietel & Holw. (1897)
- Puccinia vaga H.S. Jacks. (1922)
- Puccinia vagans (Lam. & DC.) Arthur (1934)
- Puccinia vaginatae Juel (1893)
- Puccinia vahlii Speg. (1924)
- Puccinia valantiae Pers. (1800)
- Puccinia valdiviana (Dietel & Neger) Oehrens (1971)
- Puccinia valentula H.S. Jacks. & Holw. (1932)
- Puccinia valenzueliana Speg. (1922)
- Puccinia valerianicola J.C. Lindq. (1951)
- Puccinia valida Arthur (1915)
- Puccinia vallartensis J.F. Hennen & Cummins (1973)
- Puccinia vanderystii Henn. (1907)
- Puccinia vangueriae Doidge (1927)
- Puccinia vanillosmopsidis H.S. Jacks. & Holw. (1932)
- Puccinia varelae Unamuno (1933)
- Puccinia varia (Dietel) Arthur (1918)
- Puccinia variabilis Grev. (1823)
- Puccinia varians Dietel (1908)
- Puccinia variiformis Pat. (1890)
- Puccinia variodes Jørst. (1956)
- Puccinia varioides Jørst. (1956)
- Puccinia variolans Harkn. (1884)
- Puccinia variospora Arthur & Holw. (1925)
- Puccinia velata Dietel (1897)
- Puccinia velutina Kakish. & S. Sato (1982)
- Puccinia veneta Gäum. (1941)
- Puccinia venezuelana (F. Kern, Thurst. & Whetzel) F. Kern & Thurst. (1944)
- Puccinia veniabilis H.S. Jacks. & Holw. (1932)
- Puccinia ventanensis J.C. Lindq. (1948)
- Puccinia venustula (Arthur) Arthur (1918)
- Puccinia veratricola F.L. Tai (1947)
- Puccinia verbeniphila J.C. Lindq. (1970)
- Puccinia verbesinae Schwein. (1822)
- Puccinia verbesinae-dentatae (Syd. & P. Syd.) H.S. Jacks. & Holw. (1932)
- Puccinia verbesinicola Dietel (1906)
- Puccinia vergrandis Arthur & Holw. (1918)
- Puccinia vernoniae-mollis Mayor (1914)
- Puccinia vernoniae-monosis T.S. Ramakr. & K. Ramakr. (1948)
- Puccinia vernoniae-scariosae Petch (1917)
- Puccinia vernoniicola Henn. (1895)
- Puccinia vernoniphila Speg. (1909)
- Puccinia veronicae (Schumach.) G. Winter (1881)
- Puccinia veronicae-longifoliae Savile (1968)
- Puccinia verruca Thüm. (1879)
- Puccinia versatilis Syd. (1939)
- Puccinia versicolor Dietel & Holw. (1897)
- Puccinia versicoloris Semadeni (1916)
- Puccinia vertisepta Tracy & Galloway (1888)
- Puccinia vertiseptoides Cummins (1940)
- Puccinia verwoerdiana Van der Byl (1927)
- Puccinia vesiculosa Schltdl. (1820)
- Puccinia vestita P. Syd. & Syd. (1902)
- Puccinia vexans Farl. (1883)
- Puccinia viatica J.F. Hennen & Cummins (1973)
- Puccinia viburnicola J.Y. Zhuang (1986)
- Puccinia vilfae Arthur & Holw. (1898)
- Puccinia vincae (DC.) Berk. (1836)
- Puccinia vinulla H.S. Jacks. & Holw. (1932)
- Puccinia violae (Schumach.) DC. (1815)
- Puccinia violae-glabellae Miura (1913)
- Puccinia violae-reniformis Y.Z. Wang & S.X. Wei (1980)
- Puccinia virectae Vienn.-Bourg. (1952)
- Puccinia virgae-aureae (DC.) Lib. (1837)
- Puccinia virgata Ellis & Everh. (1893)
- Puccinia virginiana Unamuno (1935)
- Puccinia visci J.W. Cribb (1955)
- Puccinia vitata J.F. Hennen & Hodges (1981)
- Puccinia vittadiniae McAlpine (1906)
- Puccinia vivipari Jørst. (1959)
- Puccinia volkartiana E. Fisch. (1904)
- Puccinia volutarellae Thirum. (1945)
- Puccinia vomica Thüm. (1880)
- Puccinia vossii Körn. ex G. Winter (1881)
- Puccinia vulcanicola Berndt (1998)
- Puccinia vulpinae J. Schröt. (1874)
- Puccinia vulpinoideae Dietel & Holw. (1894)

== W ==
- Puccinia wahlenbergiae G. Cunn. (1924)
- Puccinia waldsteiniae M.A. Curtis ex Peck (1873)
- Puccinia waltheriae F. Kern & Thurst. (1944)
- Puccinia wangiana J.Y. Zhuang & S.X. Wei (2001)
- Puccinia wangikarii Somani (1979)
- Puccinia wattiana Barclay (1890)
- Puccinia weberbaueri Henn. (1908)
- Puccinia wedeliae Mayor (1914)
- Puccinia wedeliicola H.S. Jacks. & Holw. (1932)
- Puccinia wenchuanensis B. Li (1988)
- Puccinia wendelboi Jørst. (1961)
- Puccinia wentii Gäum. (1947)
- Puccinia werdermannii Syd. (1928)
- Puccinia werneri Maire (1937)
- Puccinia whakatipu G. Cunn. (1924)
- Puccinia wiehei Cummins (1952)
- Puccinia willemetiae Bubák (1902)
- Puccinia windhoekensis Mennicken, W. Maier & Oberw. (2005)
- Puccinia windsoriae Schwein. (1832)
- Puccinia woodiana Doidge (1927)
- Puccinia woodii (Kalchbr. & Cooke) P. Syd. & Syd. (1904)
- Puccinia wulfeniae Dietel & Holw. (1895)
- Puccinia wulingensis B. Li (1988)
- Puccinia wurmbeae Cooke & Massee (1887)
- Puccinia wyomensis Arthur (1918)

== X ==
- Puccinia xanthii Schwein. (1822)
- Puccinia xanthiifoliae Ellis & Everh. (1891)
- Puccinia xanthopoda Syd. & P. Syd. (1907)
- Puccinia xanthosiae McAlpine (1906)
- Puccinia xanthosperma Syd. & P. Syd. (1906)
- Puccinia xatardiae Durrieu (1953)
- Puccinia xenosperma Syd. & P. Syd. (1913)
- Puccinia xeranthemi H. Mori (1893)
- Puccinia ximenesiae Long (1902)
- Puccinia xingwenensis P. Zhao & L. Cai (2021)
- Puccinia xinjiangensis P. Zhao & L. Cai (2021)
- Puccinia xinyuanensis J.G. Song, Aime & B. Xu (2020)
- Puccinia xylariiformis Henn. (1893)
- Puccinia xylorhizae Arthur (1901)

== Y ==
- Puccinia yahyaliensis Kabaktepe (2014)
- Puccinia yamadana Togashi & Onuma (1934)
- Puccinia yaramesuga Homma (1938)
- Puccinia yildizii Gjaerum & Bahç. (2003)
- Puccinia yokogurae Henn. (1903)
- Puccinia yokotensis Miura (1913)
- Puccinia yosemitana Blasdale (1919)
- Puccinia yunnanensis F.L. Tai (1947)

== Z ==
- Puccinia zaluzaniae Arthur (1905)
- Puccinia zanthoxyli E. Fisch. (1919)
- Puccinia zanthoxyli-chinensis P. Zhao & L. Cai (2021)
- Puccinia zapallarensis Jørst. (1958)
- Puccinia zauschneriae P. Syd. & Syd. (1902)
- Puccinia zelenikensis Poeverl. (1929)
- Puccinia zeravschanica Tranzschel & Erem. (1939)
- Puccinia zexmeniae Dietel & Holw. (1897)
- Puccinia zexmeniicola F. Kern, Cif. & Thurst. (1933)
- Puccinia zimmermanniana Henn. (1904)
- Puccinia zingiberis T.S. Ramakr. (1956)
- Puccinia zinniae P. Syd. & Syd. (1902)
- Puccinia ziziae Ellis & Everh. (1895)
- Puccinia ziziphorae P. Syd. & Syd. (1902)
- Puccinia zoegeae-crinitae Speschnew (1901)
- Puccinia zorniae (Dietel) McAlpine (1906)
- Puccinia zoysiae Dietel (1902)
- Puccinia zozimiae Zaprom. (1928)
