= Wheat diseases =

The cereal grain wheat is subject to numerous wheat diseases, including bacterial, viral and fungal diseases, as well as parasitic infestations.

== Principal diseases ==
- Barley yellow dwarf virus, BYDV
- Brown rust Puccinia recondita
- Common bunt (aka Covered smut) Tilletia caries
- Ergot Claviceps purpurea
- Eyespot Pseudocercosporella herpotrichoides
- Glume blotch Septoria nodorum
- septoria leaf blotch Mycosphaerella graminicola, synonyms: Septoria tritici, Zymoseptoria tritici
- Mildew Erysiphe graminis
- Seedling blight Fusarium spp., Septoria nodorum
- Sharp eyespot Rhizoctonia cerealis
- Spot blotch Biplolaris sorokiana
- Take-all Gaeumannomyces graminis
- Tan spot Pyrenophora tritici-repentis
- Yellow rust Puccinia striiformis

== In Europe ==
Cereals are at risk from numerous diseases due to the level of intensification necessary for profitable production since the 1970s. More recently varietal diversification, good plant breeding and the availability of effective fungicides have played a prominent part in cereal disease control. Use of break crops and good rotations are also good cultural control measures. The demise of UK straw burning in the 1980s also increased the importance of good disease control.

Active control measures include use of chemical seed treatments for seed-borne diseases and chemical spray applications for leaf and ear diseases. Development of resistance by diseases to established chemicals has been a problem during the previous 30 years.

== In the USA ==
Wheat is subject to more diseases than other grains, and, in some seasons, especially in wet ones, heavier losses are sustained from those diseases than are in other cereal crops. Wheat may suffer from the attack of insects at the root; from blight, which primarily affects the leaf or straw, and ultimately deprives the grain of sufficient nourishment; from mildew on the ear; and from gum of different shades, which lodges on the chaff or cups in which the grain is deposited.

== Fungicides ==
Fungicides used on wheat, grouped by type, with examples of the active chemical ingredient:

- Benzimidazoles
  - benomyl
  - carbendazim
- Ergosterol biosynthesis inhibitors
  - prochloraz
  - flutriafol
  - tetraconazole
- Morpholines
  - fenpropimorph
- Succinate dehydrogenase inhibitors (SDHI)
  - Succinate-analogue inhibitors
  - Ubiquinone type inhibitors
    - boscalid, a pyridine-carboxamide
    - fluopyram, a pyrimide (pyridinyl ethylbenzamide)
    - fluxapyroxad, a pyrazole-carboxamide
    - oxycarboxin, oxathiin-carboxamide
- Strobylurines
  - kresoxim-methyl
- Phthalonitriles
  - chlorothalonil
