= List of rye diseases =

This article is a list of diseases of rye (Secale cereale).

== Bacterial diseases ==
Bacterial diseases
| Bacterial streak (black chaff) | Xanthomonas campestris pv. translucens |
| Halo blight | Pseudomonas coronafaciens pv. coronafaciens |

== Fungal diseases ==
Fungal diseases
| Anthracnose | Colletotrichum graminicola Glomerella graminicola [teleomorph] |
| Black head molds | Alternaria spp. Cladosporium herbarum Davidiella tassiana, Mycosphaerella tassiana [teleomorph] Epicoccum spp. Sporobolomyces spp. Stemphylium spp. |
| Black point | Bipolaris sorokiniana [anamorph] Cochliobolus sativus [teleomorph] Fusarium spp. |
| Bunt (stinking smut) | Tilletia caries = T. tritici Tilletia laevis = T. foetida |
| Cephalosporium stripe | Hymenula cerealis = Cephalosporium gramineum |
| Common root rot and seedling blight | Bipolaris sorokiniana = Helminthosporium sativum Cochliobolus sativus [teleomorph] |
| Cottony snow mold (winter crown rot) | Coprinus psychromorbidus |
| Dilophospora leaf spot (twist) | Dilophospora alopecuri |
| Dwarf bunt | Tilletia controversa |
| Ergot | Claviceps purpurea Sphacelia segetum [anamorph] |
| Fusarium root rot | Fusarium culmorum |
| Halo spot | Pseudoseptoria donacis = Selenophoma donacis |
| Karnal bunt (partial bunt) | Neovossia indica = Tilletia indica |
| Leaf rust (brown rust) | Puccinia recondita Aecidium clematidis [anamorph] |
| Leaf streak | Mycosphaerella recutita = Cercosporidium graminis = Scolicotrichum graminis |
| Leptosphaeria leaf spot | Phaeosphaeria herpotrichoides = Leptosphaeria herpotrichoides |
| Loose smut | Ustilago tritici |
| Pink snow mold (Fusarium patch) | Monographella nivalis var. nivalis = Microdochium nivale = Fusarium nivale = Monographella nivalis [teleomorph] |
| Powdery mildew | Erysiphe graminis |
| Pythium root rot | P. aphanidermatum P. arrhenomanes P. debaryanum P. graminicola P. ultimum |
| Scab | Gibberella zeae Fusarium graminearum [anamorph] |
| Septoria leaf blotch | Septoria secalis |
| Septoria tritici blotch (speckled leaf blotch) | Zymoseptoria tritici = Septoria tritici = Mycosphaerella graminicola [teleomorph] |
| Sharp eyespot and Rhizoctonia root rot | Rhizoctonia cerealis Ceratobasidium cereale [teleomorph] |
| Snow scald (Sclerotinia snow mold) | Myriosclerotinia borealis = Sclerotinia borealis |
| Speckled (or gray) snow mold (Typhula blight) | Typhula idahoensis Typhula incarnata Typhula ishikariensis Typhula ishikariensis var. canadensis |
| Spot blotch | Bipolaris sorokiniana |
| Stagonospora blotch (glume blotch) | Stagonospora nodorum = Septoria nodorum Phaeosphaeria nodorum [teleomorph] = Leptosphaeria nodorum |
| Stalk smut (stripe smut) | Urocystis occulta |
| Stem rust | Puccinia graminis |
| Storage molds | Alternaria spp. Aspergillus spp. Epicoccum spp. Nigrospora spp. Penicillium spp. Rhizopus spp. |
| Strawbreaker (eyespot or foot rot) | Pseudocercosporella herpotrichoides Tapesia acuformis [teleomorph] |
| Stripe rust (yellow rust) | Puccinia striiformis Uredo glumarum [anamorph] |
| Take-all | Gaeumannomyces graminis |
| Tan spot (yellow leaf spot) | Pyrenophora tritici-repentis Drechslera tritici-repentis [anamorph] = Helminthosporium tritici-repentis |

== Nematodes, parasitic ==
Nematodes, parasitic
| Cereal cyst | Heterodera avenae |
| Leaf and stem | Ditylenchus dipsaci |
| Root gall | Subanguina radicicola |
| Root knot | Meloidogyne spp. |
| Seed gall | Anguina tritici |

== Viral diseases ==
Viral diseases
| Barley yellow dwarf | Barley yellow dwarf virus |
| Soilborne mosaic | Wheat soil-borne mosaic virus |
| Wheat streak mosaic | Wheat streak mosaic virus |
