= Wheat rust =

Wheat rusts include three types of Pucciniae:

- P. triticina, wheat leaf rust, leaf rust, wheat brown rust, or brown rust
- P. graminis, stem rust, wheat stem rust, barley stem rust, or black rust
- P. striiformis:

- P. striiformis var. striiformis, stripe rust, yellow rust, yellow stripe rust, or strip rust
- P. striiformis var. tritici, wheat yellow rust or wheat stripe rust

== See also ==
- For the mobile application see Nuru
