= Spot blotch =

Spot blotch may refer to:

- Spot blotch (barley), a disease of barley caused by Cochliobolus sativus
- Spot blotch (wheat), a leaf disease of wheat caused by Cochliobolus sativus
