= Common root rot =

Common root rot may refer to:

- Common root rot (barley)
- Common root rot (wheat)
- Root rot
