= Helminthosporiosis =

Helminthosporiosis may refer to two diseases of wheat:

- Cochliobolus sativus, which causes spot blotch
- Pyrenophora tritici-repentis, which causes tan spot
