= Rye rust =

There are several rusts (Pucciniales syn. Uredinales) which affect rye (Secale cereale) including:

- Puccinia spp.:

- Stem rust (Puccinia graminis)
- Leaf rust (Puccinia triticina)
- Crown rust (Puccinia coronata)

== See also ==
- List of rye diseases
