= Spot blotch (wheat) =

Fungal disease of wheat

Spot blotch of wheat
- Causal agents: Cochliobolus sativus
- Hosts: wheat

Spot blotch is a leaf disease of wheat caused by Cochliobolus sativus. Cochliobolus sativus also infects other plant parts and in conjunction with other pathogens causes common root rot and black point.

== Introduction ==
Foliar blight, Helminthosporium leaf blight (HLB), or foliar blight has been a major disease of wheat (Triticum aestivum L.) worldwide. Foliar blight disease complex consists of spot blotch and tan spot. Spot blotch is favored in warmer environments, whereas tan spot is favored in cooler environments such as United States. The tan spot forms of foliar blight appears in United States causing significant yield loss. With changed climatic conditions the disease is supposed to be increasing in cooler parts of the world. Among foliar blights the tan spot, caused by Pyrenophora tritici-repentis, is the most destructive leaf spot disease found in all wheat classes throughout the growing season across North Dakota.

The spot blotch form of foliar blight is severe particularly in warmer growing areas characterized by an average temperature in the coolest month above 17 °C. In the past 20 years, HLB has been recognized as the major disease constraint to wheat cultivation in the warmer eastern plains of South Asia. About 25 million hectares of nontraditional wheat growing area are under the pressure of the disease.

See: Knowing the Enemy: Foliar Blight

== Symptoms ==
Early lesions are characterized by small, dark brown lesions 1 to 2 mm long without chlorotic margin. In susceptible genotypes, these lesions extend very quickly in oval to elongated blotches, light brown to dark brown in colour. They may reach several centimetres before coalescing and inducing the death of the leaf. Fruiting structures develop readily under humid conditions and are generally easily observed on old lesions. If spikelets are affected, it can result in shrivelled grain and black point, a dark staining of the embryo end of the seed. The small dark brown spots on the leaves contrast with the larger, light brown spots or blotches produced by tan spot and septoria avenae blotch.

typical spot blotch sysmtom

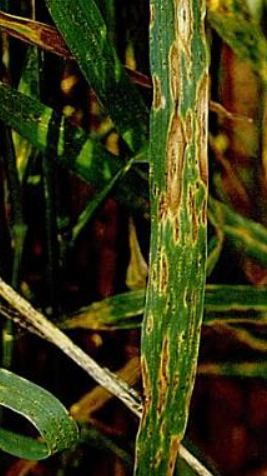
Spot blotch symptom

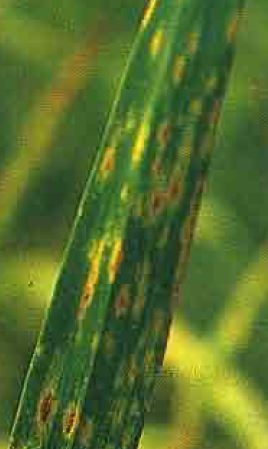
Tan spot pathogen

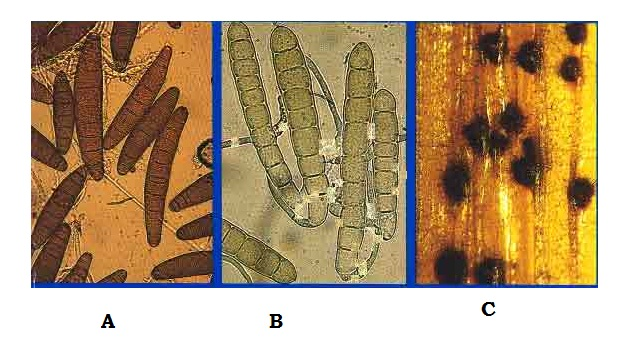
Foliar blight associated pathogens

== Crop losses ==
In recent years, Helminthosporium leaf blights (HLB), caused by both Cochliobolus sativus and Pyrenophora tritici-repentis, have emerged as serious concerns for wheat cultivation in the developing world. The disease causes significant yield losses overall 22% to complete failure of crop under severe epidemics.

== Distribution ==
The first observation in Zambia was made in the 2017/8 rainy season by someone from the Zambia Agricultural Research Institute.

== Control measures ==
The disease is very serious in different parts of the world. The management of this disease requires an integrative approach.

== An integrated approach ==
The best way to control Helminthosporium diseases is through an integrated approach. It includes the use of a variety of resistance sources, such as hexaploid wheat from Brazil and China (some of which is rate-limiting), alien genes and synthetic wheats. In addition, appropriate management practices that enhance the health of the plant populations, in general, are critical. Cooperation of pathologists, breeders and agronomists will be necessary to ensure sustainable control of this group of diseases. Economic feasibility of recommended practices has to be determined as part of the research. Options for controlling tan spot and spot blotch include disease-free seed, seed treatment with fungicides, proper crop rotation and fertilization, cultural practices in order to reduce inoculum sources, the use of chemicals and the research of disease resistance. The latter offers the best long-term control at no cost for the farmer and is ecologically safe.

== Seed health ==
In Brazil, it is recommended not to plant seed lots with more than 3% black point to limit spot blotch. Seed treatment may prove to be appropriate, although the inoculum remaining on secondary hosts or in the soil may reduce the treatment efficiency. Seed treatments with phytoalexin inducer appeared to provide good protection to wheat seedlings against B. sorokiniana infection. Seed treatment with fungicide will help protect germinating seed and seedlings from fungi causing seedling blights. Fungicide seed treatments include: captan, mancozeb, maneb, thiram, pentachloronitrobenzene (PCNB) or carboxin guazatine plus, iprodione and triadimefon (Stack and McMullen, 1988; Mehta, 1993). Seed-borne inoculum of P. tritici-repentis can be controlled with seed-applied fungicides, such as guazatine and guazatine + imazalil, but other chemicals are also effective.

== Rotations and crop management ==
Clearing or ploughing in the stubble, grass weeds and volunteer cereals reduce inoculum as does crop rotation (Diehl et al., 1982). Reis et al. (1998) indicate that eradicant fungicide treatment of the seed and crop rotation with non-host crops can control spot blotch. In the rice-wheat system of South Asia, little work has been done on the epidemiology of HLB and how management of the rotation crops affects spot blotch and tan spot, except as noted earlier. More quantitative information is required on the role of alternate rotations, soil and plant nutrition, inoculum sources and climate. In the rice-wheat system, there is a need for timely planting of wheat, better stand establishment and root development, increased soil organic matter, sufficient levels of macro- and micronutrients, and water and weed management (Hobbs et al., 1996; Hobbs and Giri, 1997). Crop rotation and organic manures will play a major role in HLB. This should favour beneficial soil organisms as well as better plant nutrition. In the rice-wheat system, it will be necessary to break the rotation with other crops to make it more sustainable, and this should help reduce disease problems in general. The use of oilseed rape in South Asia is common in mixture with wheat or in rotation. Since rape is known to have some fungitoxic effects upon decay, its effects on HLB would need research (Dubin and Duveiller, 2000). In the HLB complex, rotations would need to be sufficiently long to reduce the amount of soil inoculum. Cook and Veseth (1991) note that the kind of rotation crop may not be so important to root health as the length of time out of wheat. The rotation crops and length of rotation would have to be studied in relation to HLB.

Apparently, sound management recommendations may antagonize specific diseases as in the case of tan spot. Tan spot has been controlled largely by cultural practices, such as rotation with non-host crops and removal or burial of stubble (Rees and Platz, 1992). Bockus and Claassen (1992) observed that rotation to sorghum was as effective as ploughing for control of tan spot, and under certain conditions, crop rotations as short as one year controlled tan spot. In South Asia, recent work by Hobbs and Giri (1997) indicates that minimum tillage may be the best way to reduce turnaround time from rice to wheat and thus permit the planting of wheat more timely. Since this probably increases inoculum of tan spot, it highlights the need for integration of disciplines to determine how best to achieve attainable yields.

== Fungicides ==
Although pesticide use should be minimized, fungicides have proven useful and economical in the control of tan spot (Loughman et al., 1998) and spot blotch (Viedma and Kohli, 1998). The triazole group (e.g. tebuconazole and propiconazole) especially has proven to be very effective for both HLBs, and their judicious use should not be overlooked. However, it may provide acceptable control but not always economic return in commercial grain production. This is dependent on the price received for the wheat, the price of the fungicide and the percent yield increase from using the fungicide. Situations will differ significantly according to geographical areas and cropping conditions. Spot blotch in particular is a very aggressive disease, and under a favourable environment, spraying at one- to two-week intervals for as long as necessary may be needed to maintain the disease under control.

For general information on management of the disease visit Ohio State University Link and FAO link

== Breeding for resistance ==
The wheat cultivars of South Asia have only low to moderate levels of resistance to spot blotch. However, genetic variation for resistance has been reported in a few wheat cultivars. The best sources of resistance, to date, were identified in the Brazilian and Zambian wheat lines. Recently, a few Chinese wheat genotypes from the Yangtze River valley were identified with acceptable levels of resistance to spot blotch. The following genotypes has been reported to have satisfactory level of resistance, although complete resistance or immunity is lacking:

1 SW 89-5193

2 SW 89-3060

3 SW 89-5422

4 Chirya 7

5 Ning 8319

6 NL 781

7 Croc 1/A. sq.// Borl

8 Chirya 3

9 G162

10 Chirya 1

11 Yangmai-6

12 NL 785

The field resistance governed by Chirya-3 and Milan / Shanghai 7 was found under monogenic control

Similarly resistant genotypes Acc. No. 8226, Mon/Ald, Suzhoe#8 from India are found to possess three genes for resistance.

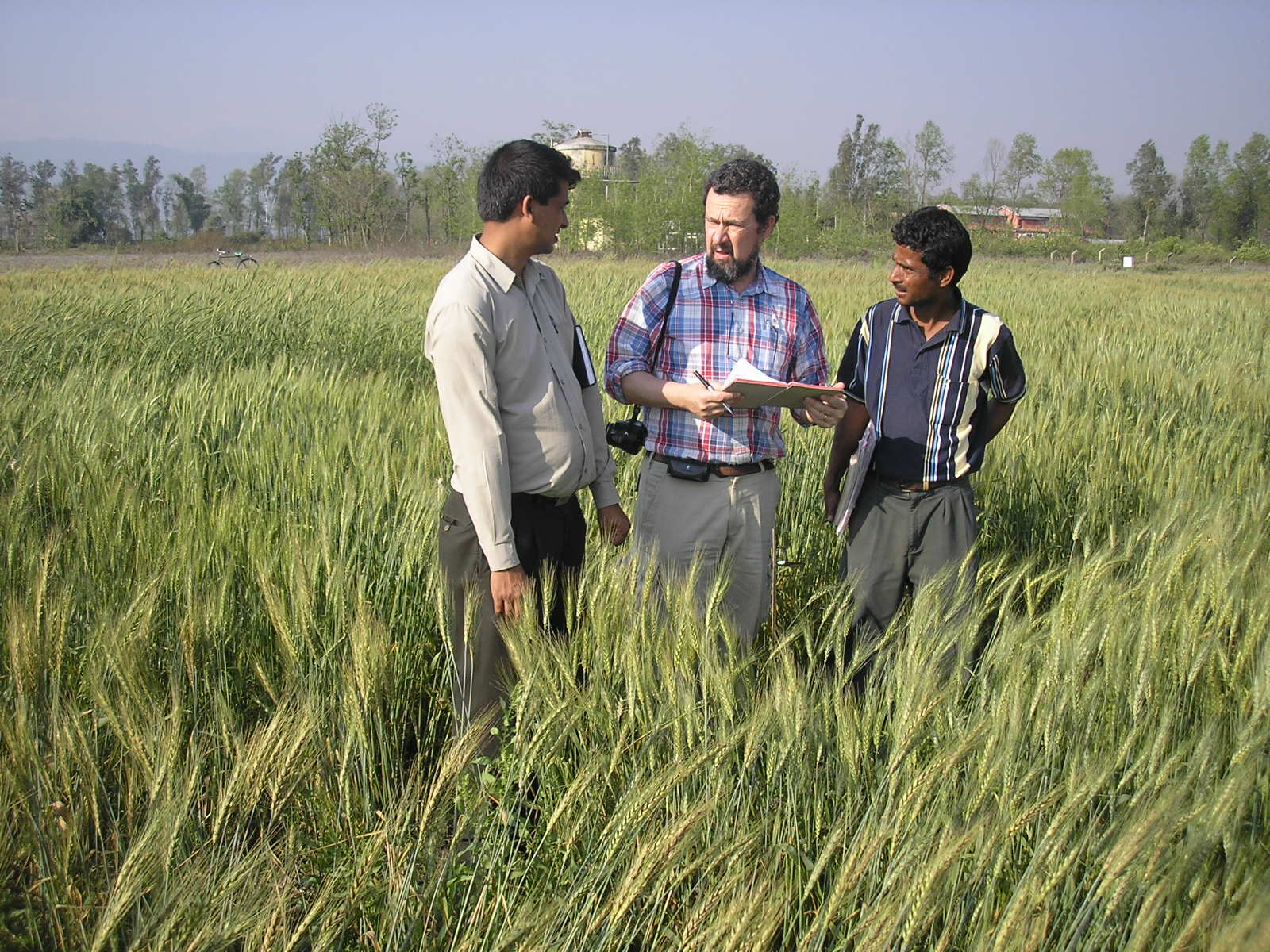
CIMMYT wheat pathologist Dr. Duveiller and Rosyara at a spot blotch screening nursery at Rampur

A study was conducted to determine microsatellite markers associated with resistance in the F7 progeny from a cross between the spot blotch-susceptible Sonalika and resistant G162 wheat genotypes. 15 polymorphic markers showed association with two bulks, one each of progeny with low and with high spot blotch severity.

One of the interesting phenomena associated with foliar blight in some of susceptible cultivars is tolerance (low yield loss even at very high level of disease severity). In addition, the resistance seems to be associated with late maturity (which is an undesirable characteristic as late maturing genotypes need to face more heat stress than early ones), complete understanding of physiological association may aid to complete understanding of the host-pathogen system.

Rosyara et al. reported that the AUDPC showed a significant negative correlation with the width of large vascular bundles, percentage of small vascular bundles with two girders and the number of large veins. Also the AUDPC was positively correlated with the distance between adjacent vascular bundles and leaf thickness. The chlorophyll or general health indicators, SPAD and AUSDC values were higher in spot blotch resistant and tolerant genotypes. The findings the study underlined the importance of mesophyll structure and chlorophyllcontent in spot blotch resistance in wheat. Also tolerant genotypes responded in the same way as artificial defoliation showing mechanisms of nutrient balance playing role. Similarly, canopy temperature depression was found associated with foliar blight resistance. Leaf tip necrosis was found to be associated with foliar blight resistance and is suggested as phenotypic marker. Different studies are done to estimate heritability and increase selection efficiency. Heritability estimates were low to high in terms of AUDPC. To increase efficiency of selection use of selection index has been suggested. The index includes days to heading (maturity related trait), thousand kernel weight, and area under foliar blight disease progress curve.
