= C. sativus =

C. sativus may refer to:

- Cochliobolus sativus, a fungus species and the causal agent of a wide variety of cereal diseases
- Crocus sativus, the saffron, a plant species native to Southwest Asia
- Cucumis sativus, the cucumber, a widely cultivated plant species
