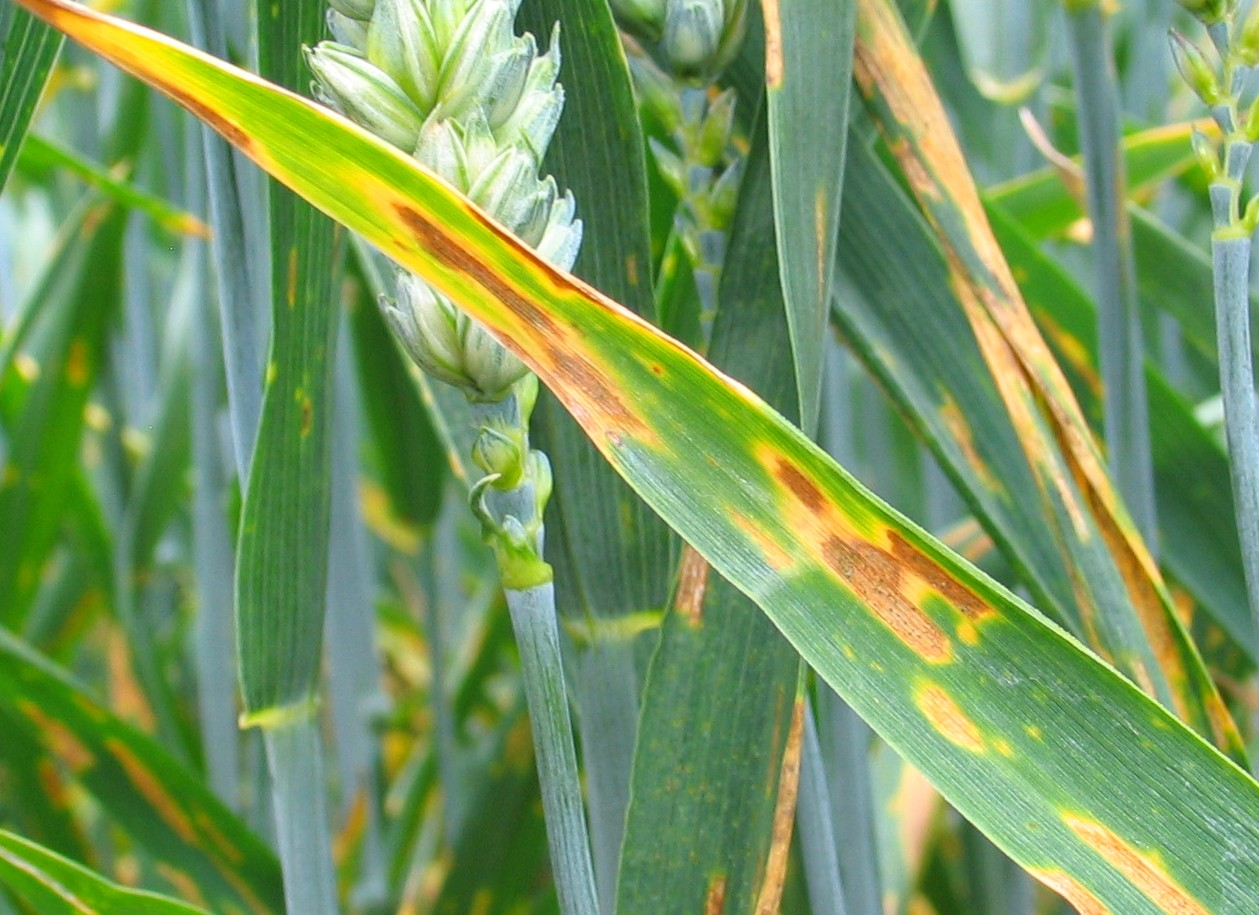
- Zymoseptoria tritici on leaves of wheat

Scientific classification
- Kingdom: Fungi
- Division: Ascomycota
- Class: Dothideomycetes
- Order: Mycosphaerellales
- Family: Mycosphaerellaceae
- Genus: Zymoseptoria
- Species: Z. tritici

Binomial name
- Zymoseptoria tritici (Roberge ex Desm.) Quaedvl. & Crous (2011)

Synonyms
- Septoria curtisiana Sacc., (1884); Septoria graminum Desm., (1843); Septoria tritici Desm., 1842 Septoria tritici Berk. & M.A. Curtis, (1874); Septoria tritici var. lolicola R. Sprague & Aar. G. Johnson, (1944); Sphaeria graminicola Fuckel, (1865); Sphaerella graminicola Fuckel, (1870); Mycosphaerella graminicola (Fuckel) J. Schröt., (1894)

= Zymoseptoria tritici =

Species of fungus

Zymoseptoria tritici, synonyms Septoria tritici, Mycosphaerella graminicola, is a species of filamentous fungus, an ascomycete in the family Mycosphaerellaceae. It is a wheat plant pathogen causing septoria leaf blotch that is difficult to control due to resistance to multiple fungicides. The pathogen today causes one of the most important diseases of wheat.

In 2011, Quaedvlieg et al. introduced a new combination for this species: Zymoseptoria tritici, as they found that the type strains of both the genus Mycosphaerella (linked to the anamorph genus Ramularia) and the genus Septoria (linked to the genus Septoria, an extensive clade of very distinct septoria-like species within the Mycosphaerellaceae) clustered separately from the clade containing both Zymoseptoria tritici and Z. passerinii. Since 2011, a total of eight Zymoseptoria species have been described within the genus Zymoseptoria; Z. tritici (the type of the genus Zymoseptoria), Z. pseudotritici, Z. ardabiliae, Z. brevis, Z. passerinii, Z. halophila, Z. crescenta and Z. verkleyi (Named after Gerard J.M. Verkleij, for the contribution that he has made to further the understanding of the genus Septoria).

== Description ==
Ripe pycnidia of Zymoseptoria tritici in a primary leaf of a susceptible wheat seedling. High humidity stimulates the extrusion of cyrrhi, tendril-like mucilages containing asexual pycnidiospores that are rain-splash dispersed over short distances.

This fungus causes septoria tritici blotch of wheat, a disease characterized by necrotic blotches on the foliage. These blotches contain asexual (pycnidia) and sexual (pseudothecia) fructifications.

Asexual state (anamorph, asexual stage was previously named as Septoria tritici): Pycnidiospores are hyaline and threadlike and measure 1.7-3.4 x 39-86 μm, with 3 to 7 indistinct septations. Germiniation of pycnidiospores can be lateral or terminal. Cirrhi are milky white to buff. Sometimes in culture nonseptate, hyaline microspores, measuring 1-1.3 × 5-9 μm, occur outside pycnidia by yeastlike budding.

Light stimulates yeast-like growth of Zymoseptoria tritici. Close-up of yeast-like growth of Zymoseptoria tritici in vitro on V8 agar.

In vitro production of asexual fructifications (pycnidia; arrow) of Zymoseptoria tritici on wheat leaf extract agar.

Penetration of a wheat leaf stoma (arrow) by a pycnidiospore germ tube of Zymoseptoria tritici.

Colonization of the mesophyll tissue by an intercellular hypha (arrows) of Zymoseptoria tritici during the symptomless biotrophic phase of pathogenesis.

Initiation (arrow head) of a pycnidium of Zymoseptoria tritici in the substomatal cavity of a wheat leaf.

Simultaneous penetration of a wheat leaf stoma by three germ tubes of sexual airborne ascospores (arrows) of Zymoseptoria tritici.

Sexual state (teleomorph): Pseudothecia are subepidermal, globose, dark brown, and 68-114 μm in diameter. Asci measure 11-14 × 30-40 μm. Ascospores are hyaline, elliptical, and 2.5-4 × 9-16 μm, with two cells of unequal length.

=== Genetics ===
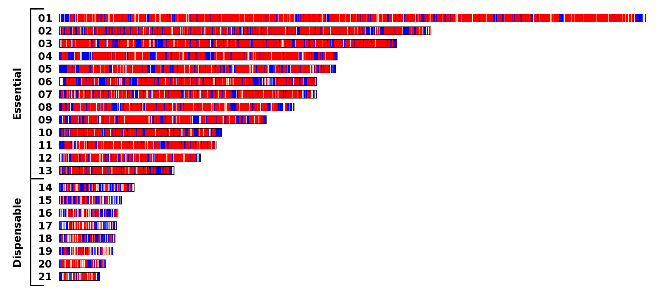
Chromosomes 1-13 are the largest and essential. Chromosomes 14-21 are smaller and dispensable.

Zymoseptoria tritici represents an intriguing model for fundamental genetic studies of plant-pathogenic fungi. It is haploid plant-pathogenic fungus. Many fungi are haploid, which greatly simplifies genetic studies.

Zymoseptoria tritici was the first species, in 2002, of the family Mycosphaerellaceae to have a linkage map created.

The first report of fully sequenced genome of Zymoseptoria tritici from 2011 was the first genome of a filamentous fungus to be finished according to current standards. The length of the genome is 39.7 Mb, that is similar to other filamentous ascomycetes. The genome contains 21 chromosomes, that is the highest number reported among ascomycetes. Furthermore, these chromosomes have an extraordinary size range, varying from 0.39 to 6.09 Mb.

A striking aspect of Zymoseptoria tritici genetics is the presence of many dispensable chromosomes. Eight of chromosomes could be lost with no visible effect on the fungus and thus are dispensable. Dispensable chromosomes have been found in other fungi but they usually occur at a low frequency and typically represent single or a few chromosomes. Dispensable chromosomes have originated by ancient horizontal transfer from an unknown donor, that was followed by extensive genetic recombination, a possible mechanism of stealth pathogenicity and exciting new aspects of genome structure.

A surprising feature of the Zymoseptoria tritici genome compared to other sequenced plant pathogens was that it contained very few genes for enzymes that break down plant cell walls, which was more similar to endophytes than to pathogens. Goodwin et al. (2011) suggested, that the stealth pathogenesis of Zymoseptoria tritici probably involves degradation of proteins rather than carbohydrates to evade host defenses during the biotrophic stage of infection and may have evolved from endophytic ancestors.

== Evolution ==
The fungus Zymoseptoria tritici has been a pathogen of wheat since host domestication 10,000–12,000 years ago in the Fertile Crescent. The wheat-infecting lineage emerged from closely related Mycosphaerella pathogens infecting wild grasses. It has coevolved and spread with its host globally. Zymoseptoria tritici shows a significantly higher degree of host specificity and virulence in a detached leaf assay.

The emergence and "co-domestication" of Zymoseptoria tritici was associated with an adaptation to wheat and an agricultural environment. Endemic descendants of the progenitor of Zymoseptoria tritici are still found on wild grasses in the Middle East; however these "wild" pathogens show a broader host range than the "domesticated" wheat pathogen. The closest known relative of Zymoseptoria tritici is named Z. pseudotritici B. Zymoseptoria pseudotritici was isolated in Iran from the two grass species Agropyron repens and Dactylis glomerata growing in close proximity to fields planted to bread wheat (Triticum aestivum). Although Z. tritici is a frequent pathogen of wheat in Iran, no evidence of gene flow between Z. pseudotritici and Z. tritici was detected based on sequence analysis of six nuclear loci.

== Life cycle ==
Zymoseptoria tritici overwinters as fruiting bodies on crop debris, mostly as pseudothecia (sexual fruiting bodies) but sometimes also some pycnidia (asexual fruiting bodies). The sexual spores are quantitatively the more significant spores involved in primary inoculum of the disease, while the asexual spores are more significant in the secondary cycle. In early spring, ascospores, the sexual spores of the fungus, are released from the pseudothecia. Ascospores are wind-dispersed and eventually land on the leaves of a host plant (bread wheat or durum wheat). Unlike most other plant pathogens, Zymoseptoria tritici uses a germ tube to enter the host leaf through stomata rather than by direct penetration. There is a long latent period of up to two weeks following infection before symptoms develop. The fungus evades host defenses during the latent phase, followed by a rapid switch to necrotrophy immediately prior to symptom expression 12–20 days after penetration. The period between infection and formation of sporulating structures (latent period) was estimated to be 20.35 ± 4.15 days for Zymoseptoria tritici in Northern Germany and decreased with increasing temperature. Such a switch from biotrophic to necrotrophic growth at the end of a long latent period is an unusual characteristic shared by most fungi in the genus Mycosphaerella. Very little is known about the cause or mechanism of this lifestyle switch even though Mycosphaerella is one of the largest and most economically important genera of plant-pathogenic fungi.

Primary inoculum requires wet conditions and cool temperatures of 50-68 °F. Under appropriate environmental conditions, lesions are able to develop on infected leaves, and soon pycnidia begin to develop on the lesions. The pycnidia appear as small dark dots on the lesions. From the pycnidia, conidiospores, the asexual spores of the fungus, are released. These asexual spores are dispersed via rain splash and are response for the secondary inoculum of this polycyclic disease cycle. When the conidiospores are splashed onto leaves, they act similarly to ascospores and cause the development of foliar lesions. In addition to pycnidia, pseudothecia also develop within these lesions. Pycnidia and pseudothecia are the structures in which the fungus overwinters, and the cycle begins again.

== Disease Management ==
Zymoseptoria tritici is a difficult fungus to control because populations contain extremely high levels of genetic variability and it has very unusual biology for a pathogen. Z. tritici has an active sexual cycle under natural conditions, which is an important driver of septoria tritici blotch epidemics and results in high genetic diversity of populations in the field.

The most effective, economical, and simple method of Z. tritici management is planting resistant cultivars. Twenty-one resistant genes have been named, mapped, and published. Mikaberidze and McDonald 2020 found a fitness tradeoff between genes for Septoria tolerance and Septoria resistance in wheat. Some cultivars are resistant in one region but susceptible in another; it depends on the local pathogen population. All varieties of bread wheat and durum wheat are susceptible to the disease to some extent, but planting varieties that have at least partial resistance to the local population of Zymoseptoria tritici can greatly improve yield.

There are also cultural management strategies that may be effective, including regular rotation of crops, deep plowing, and late planting. More specifically, rotating a recently infected field to any non-host crop can be useful in minimizing the amount of fungus present in the field. Planting winter wheat after the first ascospore flights in September is a way to reduce primary inoculum of winter wheat.

Fungicide use often simply is not economical for Septoria Leaf Blotch. The rapid evolution of pathogen resistance to fungicides is a major barrier. Zymoseptoria tritici has resistance to multiple fungicides, because it has number of substitutions of CYP51. CYP51 substitutions include Y137F which confers resistance to triadimenol, I381V which confers resistance to tebuconazole and V136A that confers resistance to prochloraz. Chemical control of the pathogen (using fungicides) now relies on the application of SDHIs, azole fungicides which are demethylase inhibitors that inhibit lanosterol 14 alpha-demethylase (CYP51) activity.

The last method of control for Zymoseptoria tritici is biological control using bacteria. Bacillus megaterium has been shown to cause about an 80% decrease in disease development in the trials done so far. Pseudomonads are also a promising bacterial control option. A benefit to using pseudomonads or bacillus is that they are not harmed by most fungicides, so they can be used in combination with chemical controls. However, a lack of commercial availability limits the use of biological controls.

== Disease Importance ==
The ascomycete fungus Zymoseptoria tritici causes septoria tritici blotch, a foliar disease of wheat that poses a significant threat to global food production. It is the primary foliar disease of winter wheat in most western European countries. Zymoseptoria tritici infects wheat crops throughout the world and is also currently a big problem in Iran, Tunisia, and Morocco. Severe epidemics of the disease have decreased wheat yields by 35-50%. In the United States, Septoria leaf blotch is a very important disease in wheat, second only to wheat rust. An estimated $275 million is lost per year in the US due to this disease. In Europe the annual losses are equivalent to over 400 million USD.

Different areas of the world are currently trying different management strategies. For example, in the Nordic-Baltic region, one of the largest wheat-producing regions of the world, the use of fungicides has substantially increased wheat yields. The fungicides that have been shown to be effective include quinone outside inhibitors (QoIs), which, like most fungicides, are expensive to apply in large quantities. As climate change begins to increase temperatures around the globe, Zymoseptoria tritici, along with many other fungal pathogens, is likely to show increased overwintering survival and therefore more substantial primary inocula. The need for effective management techniques will become even more important as the prevalence of Septoria leaf blotch increases with climate change.

Typical infection caused by Zymoseptoria tritici of the primary leaf of a resistant cultivar. Note the low fungal density in the apoplast (arrow) and the response of the mesophyll cells (arrow head), particularly the chloroplasts, to the presence of intercellular hyphae.

(upper image) Typical symptoms of Zymoseptoria tritici on a primary seedling leaf of a highly susceptible wheat cultivar. (lower image) Typical response to Zymoseptoria tritici on a primary leaf of a highly resistant wheat cultivar.

Symptoms of Zymoseptoria tritici on a naturally infected adult plant flag leaf of wheat.
