= Ralph Merrill Caldwell =

American plant pathologist and plant breeder

- Born: June 27, 1903; Brookings
- Died: November 2, 1976 (aged 73); College Station
- Alma mater: University of Wisconsin–Madison; South Dakota State University
- Occupation: Botanist
- Employer: Purdue University; United States Department of Agriculture

Ralph Merrill Caldwell (June 27, 1903, Brookings, South Dakota – November 2, 1976, College Station, Texas) was an American plant breeder, mycologist, and plant pathologist. Through his work with the U.S. Department of Agriculture and Purdue University, he developed disease-resistant cultivars for a wide variety of plants, including widely-grown wheat cultivars.

Caldwell was a member of the American Phytopathological Society, where he served as President of the North Central Division and Treasurer. He was a fellow of the American Phytopathological Society, the American Society of Agronomy, the Crop Science Society of America, and the American Association for the Advancement of Science. His papers are held by the University of Purdue.

== Life and education ==
Ralph Merrill Caldwell was born on June 27, 1903, in Brookings, South Dakota. He obtained his Bachelor of Science (B.S.) degree in agronomy in 1925 from South Dakota State University. He then attended the University of Wisconsin–Madison, earning his M.S. in botany in 1927, and his Ph.D. in Plant Pathology in 1929.

Caldwell married Margaret Dunlap and had a daughter, Janet (Mrs. R. W. Storts). He died on November 2, 1976, in College Station, Texas.

== Career ==
Caldwell worked for two years for the U.S. Department of Agriculture as the Wisconsin State Leader for Barberry Eradication (1928-1930). In 1930 he became an Associate Plant Pathologist for the USDA, replacing Edwin Butterworth Mains at Purdue University. In 1937 Caldwell resigned from his position with the USDA to take on additional administrative duties at Purdue but continued to be a USDA Collaborator.

From 1937 to 1950 Caldwell served as Head of the Department of Botany and Plant Pathology at Purdue University. As of 1954, Caldwell returned to research full-time, focusing on the breeding of cereals. He served as an associate editor of the journal Phytopathology from 1954 to 1957.

Caldwell acted as a consultant to the international wheat breeding program of the International Maize and Wheat Improvement Center (CIMMYT), and the DeKalb Seed Company. He retired on June 20, 1971.

== Research ==
At Purdue University, Caldwell worked closely with Leroy Compton to study wheat leaf rust and expanded Purdue's breeding program for disease-resistant plants. They organized a three-crop per year rotation with two crops in the greenhouse and one in the field, including fall planting of grains such as winter wheat, barley, and oats. By hybridizing an exotic into an adapted line and backcrossing the hybrid to another adapted line, they rapidly developed improved breeding lines and new cultivars. Caldwell helped to develop 40 cultivars of wheat, oats, and barley, including 'Knox' and 'Arthur'.

Caldwell focused on developing productive cultivars with improved disease resistance to diseases such as leaf rust and pests such as Hessian fly. His 'Knox' and 'Monon' cultivars had the additional benefit of maturing early. As department head, Caldwell also supported programs to study soybean diseases, apple scab resistance, and the impact of the cereal leaf beetle.

Caldwell encouraged open an exchange of information and plant materials from the Purdue program, widely sharing its breeding stocks. He brought scientists together from the fields of plant pathology, agronomy, and entomology and created an infrastructure for interagency collaboration between Purdue and the USDA.

Caldwell developed disease-resistant cultivars for a wide variety of plants, including small grains, corn, soybeans, tomatoes, and apples. His wheat cultivars were widely grown. By 1974, Purdue's soft red winter wheat cultivars were the highest-producing in 17 states, representing more than 50% of the acreage of 14 states. In 1965, 19% of the spring oats that the United States certified for seed came from Purdue cultivars. Cultivars such as Triticum aestivum L. 'Caldwell', released by Purdue in 1981, continue to be used to study the genetic basis of disease resistance to leaf rust caused by Puccinia triticina.
