= Eyespot (wheat) =

Fungal disease of wheat

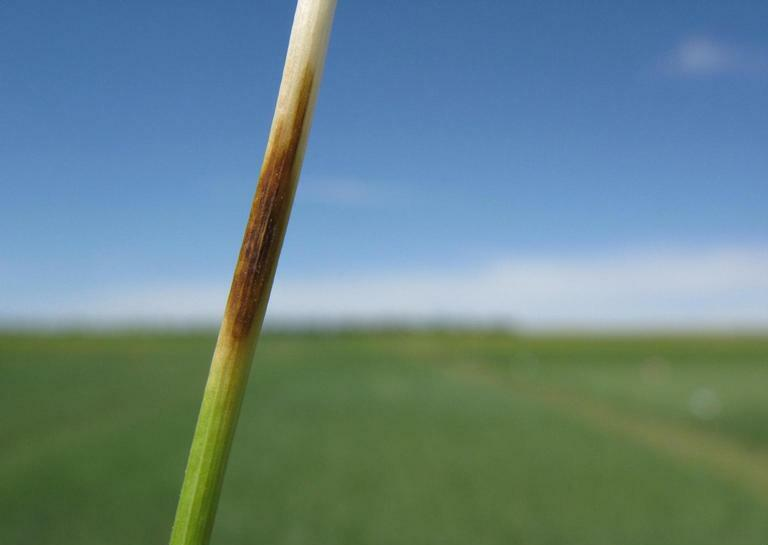
Eyespot symptoms on wheat

Eyespot is an important fungal disease of wheat caused by the necrotrophic fungus Tapesia yallundae (syn: Pseudocercosporella herpotrichoides; W-type [anamorph]; Oculimacula yallundae) and Tapesia acuformis (syn: Pseudocercosporella herpotrichoides; R-type [anamorph]; Oculimacula acuformis). It is also called Strawbreaker. Eyespot is more severe where wheat is grown continuously and when the weather is cool and moist. Treating crops against eyespot with fungicide costs millions to farmers and is complicated by the pathogen becoming resistant to the more commonly used fungicides. Severe cases of the disease can reduce yield by up to 40%. It is most common in temperate regions such as North and South America, Europe, Australia, New Zealand and Africa.

== Symptoms ==
The eye-shaped elliptical lesions which give eyespot its name form on lower stem bases near to the soil surface. The lesions are straw yellow, often with black pupil-like dots in the centre, and are bordered by greenish-brown to dark-brown rings. In cases of severe infection stems are weakened at the point of infection which makes the host susceptible to lodging. This symptom is associated with the W-type (Oculimacula yallundae). Alternatively in other cases of severe infection the nutrient and water supply to the plant is disturbed, resulting in low quality grain and whitehead production due to early maturation. This is associated with the R-type (Oculimacula acuformis)

== Development of infection ==
It is more severe if wheat is grown continuously in same field over the same period. The fungus grows as mycelium which penetrates successive leaf sheaths throughout the growing season. High humidity, cool, and damp weather at the soil surface favours disease development. Dry and hot weather causes the leaf sheaths of the plant to dry and fall off, taking the inoculum with it, thus lessening disease.

== Invasion of fungi ==
Invasion of Pseudocercosporella herpotrichoides in wheat initiates with release of enzyme for breaking the plant cell wall. A specific sequence of enzymes is employed; without these enzymes the fungus would not be able to invade the plant cell. The process begins with breaking of the leaf cuticle by formation of appressoria which provide the mechanical force to break into the cell. Then pectin, cellulase, hemicellulase and protease enzymes are released to enable invasion into the host cell. Now the fungus is present in the plant stem, it causes disease by affecting nutrient and water supply to upper parts of the plant, weakening the plant stem. In some cases beta, 1-3 glycan synthase is also released to penetrate the callose matrix.

== Plant defences ==
Once the fungus penetrates the wheat cell wall, the fungal cell wall materials (i.e. chitin) act as elicitors which interact with plant receptors and induce the plant defence mechanism. One product of this is reinforcement of the cell wall in an attempt to stop the invasion. The plant starts forming the papillae - a callose matrix (cellulose, suberin, protein, gums, calcium and silicon) which provides extra resistance to penetration, however this barrier does remain effective for long if the level of micro-organisms present is high. Wheat cells also release hydroxyproline glycoprotein (HRGP) in their cell walls. Secretion of HRGP is dependent on the signal induced by the fungal elicitors stimulating the transcription of genes encoding HRGP accumulation in the cell wall. In the case of wheat HRGP is less accumulated allowing for more easy invasion by the fungus. Wheat also releases silicon when it is attacked by the fungus. This acts as a regulator of the plant defence mechanism. It can interfere with cationic co-factor of enzymes which influences pathogenesis related events.

As a further defence mechanism wheat releases WGA which contains lectins and has a toxic effect on metabolism of fungi.

== Method of control ==
1. The best method of control for eyespot disease is breeding for resistance. Currently the gene conferring resistance to eyespot is the Pch1 gene. To generate resistant cultivars, plants containing this gene are bred with others to pass the gene to their offspring.
2. Crop rotation is also important in reducing the extent of disease because eyespot fungi live on debris of the previous crop. Cropping the wheat with alternate non-host crops and with set-aside periods of at least one year helps to lessen disease.
3. Use of fungicide can be effective in the short term but is not a long-term solution as the pathogen can develop resistance to fungicides. Application of chemicals is also costly.
