= Kharchia wheat =

Kharchia Local is a tall, landrace wheat cultivar. It is native to sodic-saline soils of Kharchia tehsil of the Pali district of Rajasthan in India, and is a line developed from selections from farmer's fields. It is the most salt tolerant wheat genotype found in India. Kharchia is red grained, and is highly susceptible to rust, making it unpopular with many farmers.

Kharchia 65 is a derived cultivar of Kharchia Local developed through back cross breeding with a rust-resistant type. In India most of the improved salinity-resistant varieties have been developed using Kharchia 65 as a base, and it is used as a standard for the salt tolerance test of wheat worldwide. Yield of about 10-20 Q/ha. have been reported for Kharchia, irrigated with waters having less than 10 mmhos/cm (=6400 ppm or 6400 mg/L approx).

== See also ==
- Wheat leaf rust
