= Common root rot (barley) =

Fungal disease of barley

Common root rot is a fungal disease of barley caused by Cochliobolus sativus, Fusarium culmorum and F. graminearum.

== Symptoms ==
Initial symptoms appear as small brown spots on the crown roots, the lower sheath, and the subcrown internode. This spots will elongate and coalesce and can cause an extensive brown discoloration at the crown, and the entire length of the subcrown internode. Healthy root tissue is white to slightly cream-colored.

== Disease cycle ==
In western Canada, infections occur mainly from soil-borne spores, whereas in eastern Canada, seed-borne inoculum is more important. The spores can survive for many years, and germinate in the presence of susceptible plants. At infected plants reach maturity, abundant sporulation occurs.

== Management ==
Disease inoculum is reduced by long rotations with nonhost crops. Shallow seeding and optimum fertilization levels, especially of phosphate and potassium, reduce disease severity. Resistance cultivars are also available.
