= Tapesia yallundae =

Scientific classification
- Kingdom: Fungi
- Division: Ascomycota
- Class: Leotiomycetes
- Order: Helotiales
- Family: Mollisiaceae
- Genus: Tapesia
- Species: T. yallundae

Binomial name
- Tapesia yallundae Wallwork & Spooner

Synonyms
- Cercosporella herpotrichoides Fron 1912; Helgardia herpotrichoides Crous & W. Gams; Pseudocercosporella herpotrichoides (Fron) Deighton 1973; Pseudocercosporella herpotrichoides var. herpotrichoides (Fron) Deighton 1973; Ramulispora herpotrichoides (Fron) Arx 1983; Tapesia yallundae var. yallundaevWallwork & Spooner

Plant fungal disease

Tapesia yallundae is the causal agent for a variety of cereal and forage grass diseases. The anamorph of T. yallundae is the W-type strain of Pseudocercosporella herpotrichoides. The R-type strain of Pseudocercosporella herpotrichoides is now known as Tapesia acuformis.

== Morphology ==
Produces two types of mycelium - one vegetative, yellow-brown, linear, and branching, the other dark and stromalike. Conidiophores are simple or sparingly branched. Conidia (1.5-3.5 x 37-70 μm) are hyaline, curved, and mostly five- to seven-celled. Sclerotia or sclerotialike stromatic mycelium, at first white to yellow-brown but later dark brown, may also be found on the lesions of infected plants.

Black apothecia, 0.2 to 0.5 mm of diameter, form at the base of host culms. Apothecium contain cylindric to fusoid asci, of 35 to 38 μm x 5.9 to 7.4 μm. Ascospores are hyaline, fusoid, 0-1 septate, with a rounded end and an average size of 8.9 μm (7.4 to 10.3) x 2.07 μm (1.95 to 2.34).

== Growth media ==
Tapesia yallundae can be grown on a moist, sterile wheat and barley straw, oat kernels, and a variety of simple agar media, preferably supplemented with wheat extract. Sporulation in vitro tends to originate from loose sporodochai. Young colonies on potato-dextrose agar are gray, compact and mounded.

== Molecular characterization ==
Polymerase chain reaction (PCR) combined with restriction enzyme digestion of an amplified ribosomal DNA fragment, are now used to characterize T. yallundae isolates. Novartis produces a polymerase chain reaction (PCR) diagnostic tool that provides cereal growers with an efficient means for checking the progression of eyespot disease in cereals. The tool reveals the presence and extent of disease before symptoms develop and can identify the different eyespot strains including the W-type (Tapesia yallundae') and R-type (Tapesia acuformis).

== Host species ==
Aegilops cylindrica^{1,}, Aegilops ovata^{1,}, Aegilops sp.^{1,}, Aegilops triuncialis^{1,}, Agropyron cristatum^{1,}, Agropyron dasystachyum^{1,}, Agropyron inerme^{1,}, Agropyron repens^{1,}, Agropyron riparium^{1,}, Agropyron sp.^{1,}, Avena fatua^{1,}, Avena sativa^{1,}, Avena sp.^{1,}, Balsamorhiza sp.^{1,}, Bromus carinatus^{1,}, Bromus inermis^{1,}, Bromus japonicus^{1,}, Bromus sterilis^{1,}, Bromus tectorum^{1,}, Delphinium sp^{1,}., Festuca idahoensis^{1,}, Hordeum distichon^{1,}, Hordeum vulgare^{1,}, Koeleria cristata^{1,}, Lithospermum ruderale^{1,}, Lomatium triternatum^{1,}, Poa sandbergii^{1,}, Poa secunda, Secale cereale, Sitanion hystrix^{1,}, Trisetum aestivum^{1,}, Triticum aestivum^{1,}, Triticum dicoccum^{1,}, Triticum durum^{1,}, Triticum monococcum^{1,}, Triticum sp.^{1,}, Triticum spelta^{1,}, Triticum vulgare^{1,}

== Notes ==
1. USDA ARS Fungal Database

== Main diseases ==
Eyespot of wheat; eyespot of barley; eyespot of rye.

== Geographical distribution ==
Geographical distribution
Africa	South Africa^{1}
Australasia^{3},^{4}	Australia^{4}, New Zealand^{3}
Europe^{4}	Denmark, France, Great Britain, Germany^{3}, Greece, Scotland^{1}, USSR^{4}
North America	Canada (Alberta, British Columbia^{2}, Ontario^{2}, Queber^{2}), United States (Idaho^{1}, Michigan^{1}, Montana^{1}, New York^{1}, Oregon^{1}, Washington^{1})
South America	Chile

== Notes ==
1. USDA ARS Fungal Database
2. Slopek, Stephen W.; Brent Fletcher; Ted J. Labun (1990). "First report of eyespot Pseudocercosporella herpotrichoides in wheat in the Prairie Provinces" (PDF). Canadian Plant Disease Survey. 70 (2): 119–121.
3. King, Amber C. (1990). "Observations of apothecia of Tapesia yallundae and the cultural phenotypes of their progeny". Plant Pathology. 40 (3): 367–373. doi:10.1111/j.1365-3059.1991.tb02392.x.
4. Ginns, J. (1986). Compendium of plant diseases and decay fungi in Canada, 1960-1980. Canadian Government Publishing Centre, Ottawa, Canada. pp. 416pp.
5. Anon. (1981). Distribution maps of plant diseases. No. 74. Commonwealth Mycological Institute, Kew.

== Sources ==
- Index Fungorum
- USDA ARS Fungal Database
