= Tapesia acuformis =

Scientific classification
- Kingdom: Fungi
- Division: Ascomycota
- Class: Leotiomycetes
- Order: Helotiales
- Family: Mollisiaceae
- Genus: Tapesia
- Species: T. acuformis

Binomial name
- Tapesia acuformis Boerema, R. Pieters & Hamers) Crous

Synonyms
- Oculimacula acuformis (Boerema, R. Pieters & Hamers) Crous & W. Gams; Ramulispora acuformis (Nirenberg) Crous 1995; Tapesia yallundae var. acuformis Boerema, R. Pieters & Hamers 1992

Species of fungus

Tapesia acuformis is the causal agent for a variety of cereal and forage grass diseases. The anamorph of T. acuformis was formerly known as the R-type strain of Pseudocercosporella herpotrichoides. The W-type strain of P. herpotrichoides is now known as T. yallundae.

== Management ==
Agropyron elongatum's genetic resistance to this disease is useful to introgress into wheat.

== See also ==
- List of rye diseases
- List of wheat diseases
