= Puccinia gansensis =

Scientific classification
- Domain: Eukaryota
- Kingdom: Fungi
- Division: Basidiomycota
- Class: Pucciniomycetes
- Order: Pucciniales
- Family: Pucciniaceae
- Genus: Puccinia
- Species: P. gansensis

Binomial name
- Puccinia gansensis M. Liu & Hambl.

Species of fungus

Puccinia gansensis is a species of fungus and a plant pathogen. It was originally found on the leaves of on Achnatherum inebrians (species of needlegrass) in Gansu, China.

== See also ==
- List of Puccinia species
