= Puccinia striiformis var. striiformis =

Scientific classification
- Kingdom: Fungi
- Division: Basidiomycota
- Class: Pucciniomycetes
- Order: Pucciniales
- Family: Pucciniaceae
- Genus: Puccinia
- Species: P. striiformis
- Variety: P. s. var. striiformis

Trinomial name
- Puccinia striiformis var. striiformis Westend., (1854)

Synonyms
- List: Dicaeoma glumarum (J.C. Schmidt) Arthur & Fromme, N. Amer. Fl. (New York) 7(5): 338 (1920); Pleomeris glumarum (J.C. Schmidt) Syd., Annls mycol. 19(3-4): 171 (1921); Puccinia glumarum (J.C. Schmidt) Erikss. & Henning, Z. PflKrankh. 4: 197 (1894); Puccinia rubigo-vera var. tritici (Erikss.) Carleton, Bull. U.S. Dep. Agric. Washington, Div. Veg. Physiol. Pathol. 16: 20 (1899); Puccinia striiformis Erikss.; Puccinia tritici Oerst., Om. Sygd. hos planterne: 93 (1863); Trichobasis glumarum Lév., in Orbigny, Dict. Univ. Hist. Nat. 12: 785 (1849); Uredo glumarum J.C. Schmidt, Allgem. ökonom.-techn. Fl., oder ... 1: 27 (1827); Uredo glumarum Roberge, in Desmazières, Pl. crypt. exsicc. 3: no. 1477 (1843)

Species of fungus

Puccinia striiformis is a fungal species and plant pathogen. It causes stripe rust on wheat, but has other hosts as well. The species is common in Europe and in more recent years has become a problem in Australia. Crop infections can cause losses of up to 40%, and the fungus will infect both winter wheat and spring wheat.

== Taxonomy ==
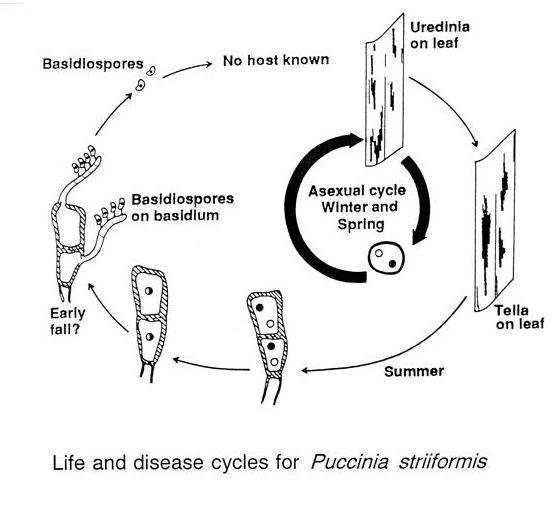

The taxonomy of P. striiformis was revised by Liu & Hambleton in 2010. These strains – commonly called stripe rusts of wheat and other grasses – were redefined as a sensu lato and separated into four species based on molecular and morphological studies: Puccinia striiformis sensu stricto (on Aegilops, Elymus, Hordeum and Triticum spp.), Puccinia pseudostriiformis (on Poa spp.), Puccinia striiformoides (on Dactylis glomerata, which Liu & Hambleton believe to generalize to all Dactylis) and Puccinia gansensis (a sp. nov. they find on Achnatherum inebrians). P. striiformis, can greatly decrease wheat yield in northern Punjab and Khyber Pakhtunkhwa (NWFP).

== See also ==
- Wheat yellow rust
- List of Puccinia species
