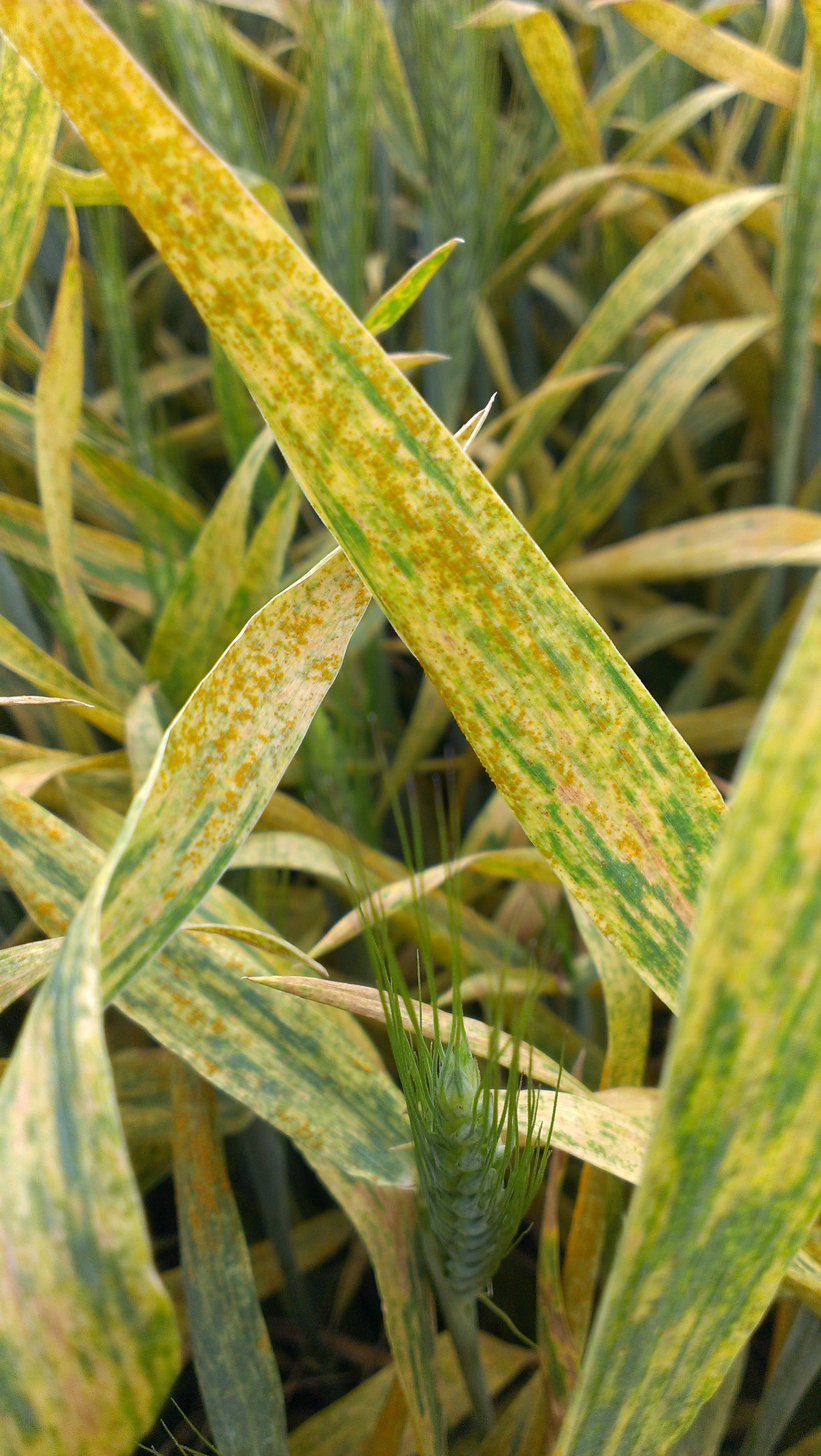
- Yellow rust on the leaves of winter triticale

Scientific classification
- Kingdom: Fungi
- Division: Basidiomycota
- Class: Urediniomycetes
- Order: Uredinales
- Family: Pucciniastraceae
- Genus: Puccinia
- Species: P. striiformis
- Form: P. s. f. sp. tritici

Trinomial name
- Puccinia striiformis f. sp. tritici Westend., (1854)

Synonyms
- Dicaeoma glumarum; Puccinia glumarum; Puccinia rubigo-vera; Puccinia straminis; Puccinia striiformis; Trichobasis glumarum; Uredo glumarum

= Wheat yellow rust =

Fungal disease of wheat

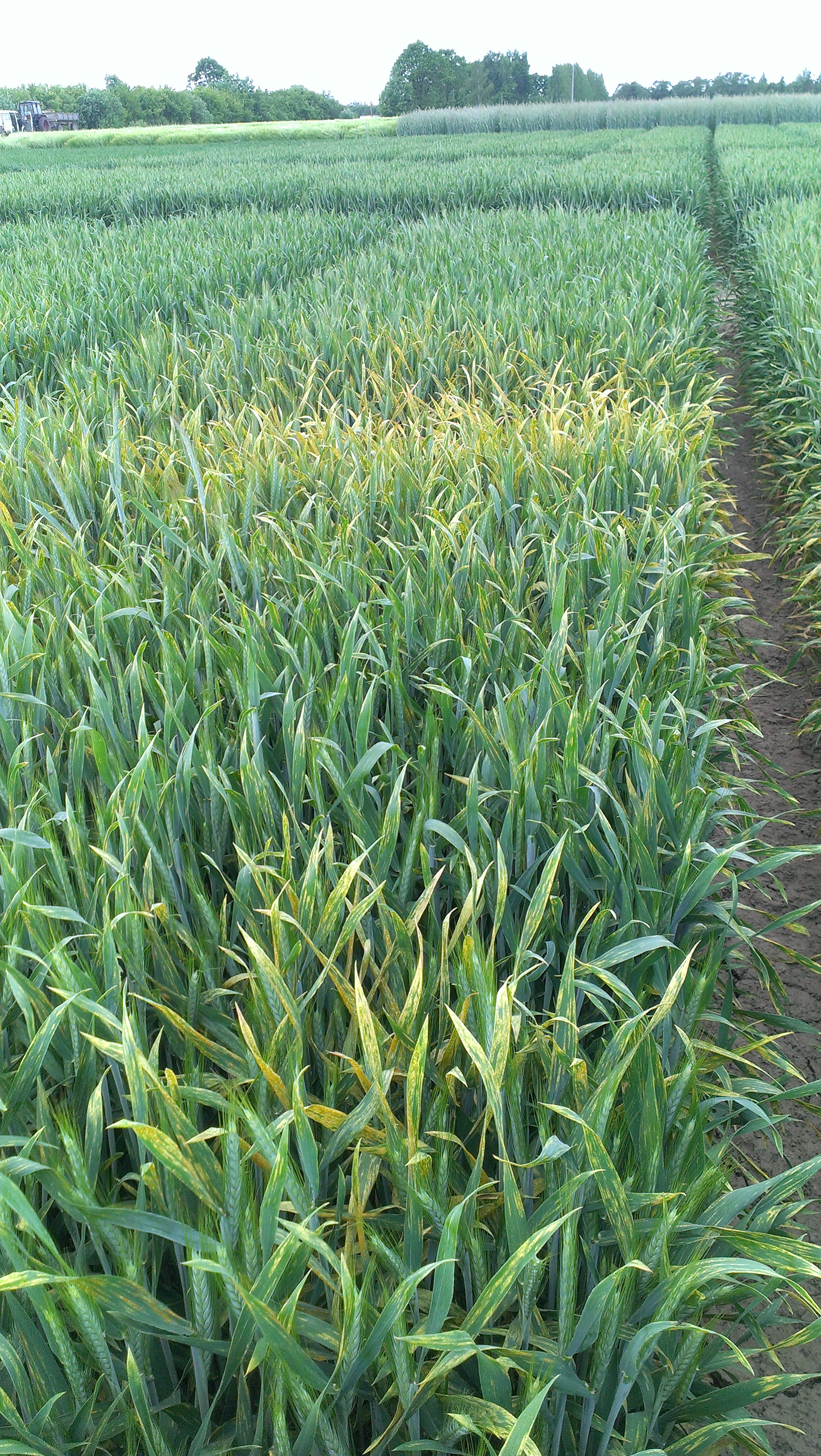
Yellow rust distribution in winter triticale

Wheat yellow rust (Puccinia striiformis f.sp. tritici), also known as wheat stripe rust, is one of the three major wheat rust diseases, along with stem rust of wheat (Puccinia graminis f.sp. tritici) and leaf rust (Puccinia triticina f.sp. tritici).

== History ==
As R.P. Singh, J. Huerta-Espino, and A.P. Roelfs say in their 2002 comprehensive review of literature on the wheat rusts for UN FAO:

Although Gadd first described stripe rust of wheat in 1777, it was not until 1896 that Eriksson and Henning (1896) showed that stripe rust resulted from a separate pathogen, which they named P. glumarum. In 1953, Hylander et al. (1953) revived the name P. striiformis.

A stripe rust outbreak in northwest Syria contributed to the beginning of the Syrian Civil War by increasing food prices.

== Life cycle ==
Other cereal rust fungi have macrocyclic, heteroecious life cycles, involving five spore stages and two phylogenetically unrelated hosts. P. striiformis was thought to be microcyclic for centuries until 2009, when a team of scientists at the USDA-ARS Cereal Disease Lab led by Yue Jin confirmed that barberry (Berberis and Mahonia spp.) is an alternate host. Barberry was known as an alternate host of the closely related stem rust (Puccinia graminis) and for many years, when infection was observed on barberry, it was assumed to be stem rust. (Then P. striiformis was accidentally discovered to also have the same alternate host when scientists observed rust infection on various barberry species, and inoculated spores of this unknown rust onto Poaceae hosts. Kentucky Bluegrass was the only one to show infection. The uredinia were characteristic of stripe rust.) Later, infected wheat plants bearing teliospores were soaked in water and suspended over barberry species. Infection was produced, thus solving a "century-old mystery" of plant pathology. This finding is regarded as revolutionary across the discipline and additionally among mycologists.

== Symptoms ==
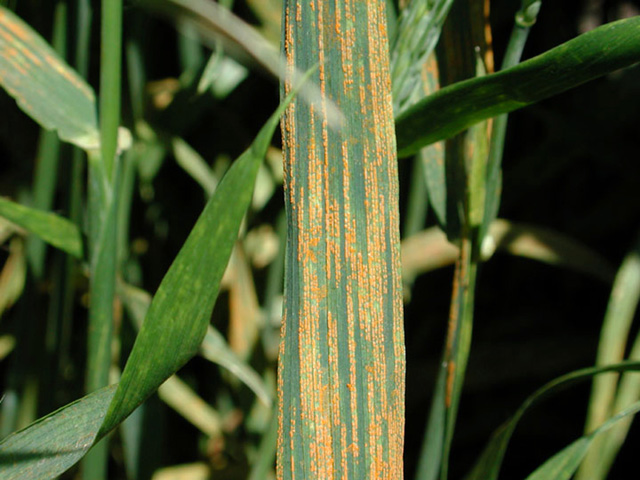
Stripe rust on wheat

Yellow rust, or stripe rust, takes its name from the appearance of yellow-colored stripes produced parallel along the venations of each leaf blade. These yellow stripes are actually characteristic of uredinia that produce yellow-colored urediniospores. Primary hosts of yellow rust of wheat are Triticum aestivum (bread wheat), Triticum turgidum (durum wheat), triticale, and a few Hordeum vulgare (barley) cultivars. Berberris serves as its alternative host.

The disease usually occurs early in the growth season, when temperature ranges between 2 and 15 °C (36 and 59 °F); but it may occur to a maximum of 23 °C (73 °F). High humidity and rainfall are favorable conditions for increasing the infection on both leaf blade and leaf sheath, even on spikes when in epidemic form. Symptoms are stunted and weakened plants, shriveled grains, fewer spikes, loss in number of grains per spike and grain weight. Losses can be 50%, but in severe situations 100% is vulnerable. Since yellow rust can occur whenever the wheat plants in green and the environmental condition conducive for the spore infection, yellow rust is a severe problem in the wheat-producing regions worldwide. Temperatures during the time of winter wheat emergence and the coldest period of the year are crucial for epidemic development in winter-habit wheat crops.

== Worldwide population structure ==
Both the spatial genetic structure and the spatial dissemination of this disease have been investigated. Population genetic analyses indicate a strong regional heterogeneity in levels of recombination, with clear signatures of recombination in the Himalayan and near-Himalayan regions and a predominant clonal population structure in other regions. The existence of a high genotypic diversity, recombinant population structure, high sexual reproduction ability, and the abundance of the alternate host (Berberis spp.) in the Himalayan and neighboring regions suggest the region as a plausible Pst center of origin or at least very close to its centre of origin. However, further exploration may be useful from Central Asia to East Asian regions.

== Disease management ==
Breeding of resistant varieties is the most cost-effective method to control this rust. Fungicides are available but vary in availability depending on their registration restrictions by national or state governments. Development of varieties resistant to the disease is always an important objective in wheat breeding programs for crop improvement. This has been done in the past, however as normal, these resistance genes became ineffective due to the acquisition of virulence to that particular resistance gene rendering the variety susceptible - necessitating ongoing variety development.

=== Resistance genes ===
These genes are most often abbreviated Yr and Yr1, Yr24, etc.

QYr.niab-2D.1 is a quantitative trait locus (QTL) for adult plant resistance (APR). This allele comes from the Claire variety. Bouvet et al., 2021 discovered it when investigating unknown resistance in the UK 2015 and 2016 seasons. It has since broken down however.

==== Lebanon ====
Although Yr6, Yr7, Yr8, Yr9, Yr10, Yr17, Yr24, Yr25, and Yr27 are no longer effective in Lebanon, Yr1, Yr3, Yr4, Yr5, Yr15 are still effective against yellow rust pathotypes prevalent there.

== See also ==
- Puccinia striiformis var. striiformis
