= Spot blotch (barley) =

Fungal disease of barley

- Causal agents: Cochliobolus sativus
- Hosts: Barley
- EPPO Code: COCHSA

Spot blotch is a disease of barley caused by Cochliobolus sativus. The disease is found everywhere that barley is grown, but only causes significant yield losses in warm, humid climates.

== Symptoms ==
Infections appear as dark, chocolate-colored blotches. The spots merge, eventually forming irregular necrotic patches on the leaves. Leaf spots may be surrounded by a zone of yellow leaf tissue of varying width. Spot may also appear on the leaf sheaths, necks and heads of the plant. Heavily infected leaves dry up completely, and infections on the flag leaf during kernel filling are the most serious.

== Disease cycle ==
The fungus overwinters in barley straw and stubble, in the soil, or on the seed. Spores are produced on barley debris in the spring and are dispersed by wind and rain. Barley seedlings may become infected from inoculum on the seed or in the soil.

Temperatures above 20°C and moist humid conditions within the crop canopy favour spot blotch development. Conducive weather conditions may favour successive production of new spores and lesions leading to rapid disease development during the growing season.

== Yield loss ==
The disease may be particularly damaging in the Upper Midwest of the United States. Yield losses of 10-30% may be occur when weather conditions are conducive to disease development.

== Management ==
The disease is managed by using resistant varieties, clean seed, seed treatments, foliar fungicide and rotation to non-cereal crops.
