= Black point (disease) =

Fungal disease of wheat, barley and rye

Black point (blackpoint, kernel smudge or just smudge) is often considered a fungal disease that affects wheat, barley and rye. It is thought to be caused by various species of Alternaria, Fusarium, and Helminthosporium, and possibly other fungal genera. The fungus forms after the seeds have set but while they are still green and it is potentiated by high humidity. Infected areas are brown to black in color, and as the disease spreads the kernels may become shriveled. Occasionally the infected areas have a reddish tinge.

Some authorities make a distinction between "black point" and "smudge". For them the disease is "black point" from initial infection until more than half of the kernel is infected, or when the disease has entered into the seed's crease. Several studies have been unable to satisfy Koch's postulates or to associated black point with fungal infection. They have concluded that Black Point is purely a physiological disorder and that Smudge is a separate issue caused by fungal pathogens. Red smudge being the result of Fusarium or Pyrenophora infection and black smudge by Alternaria or Bipolaris.
