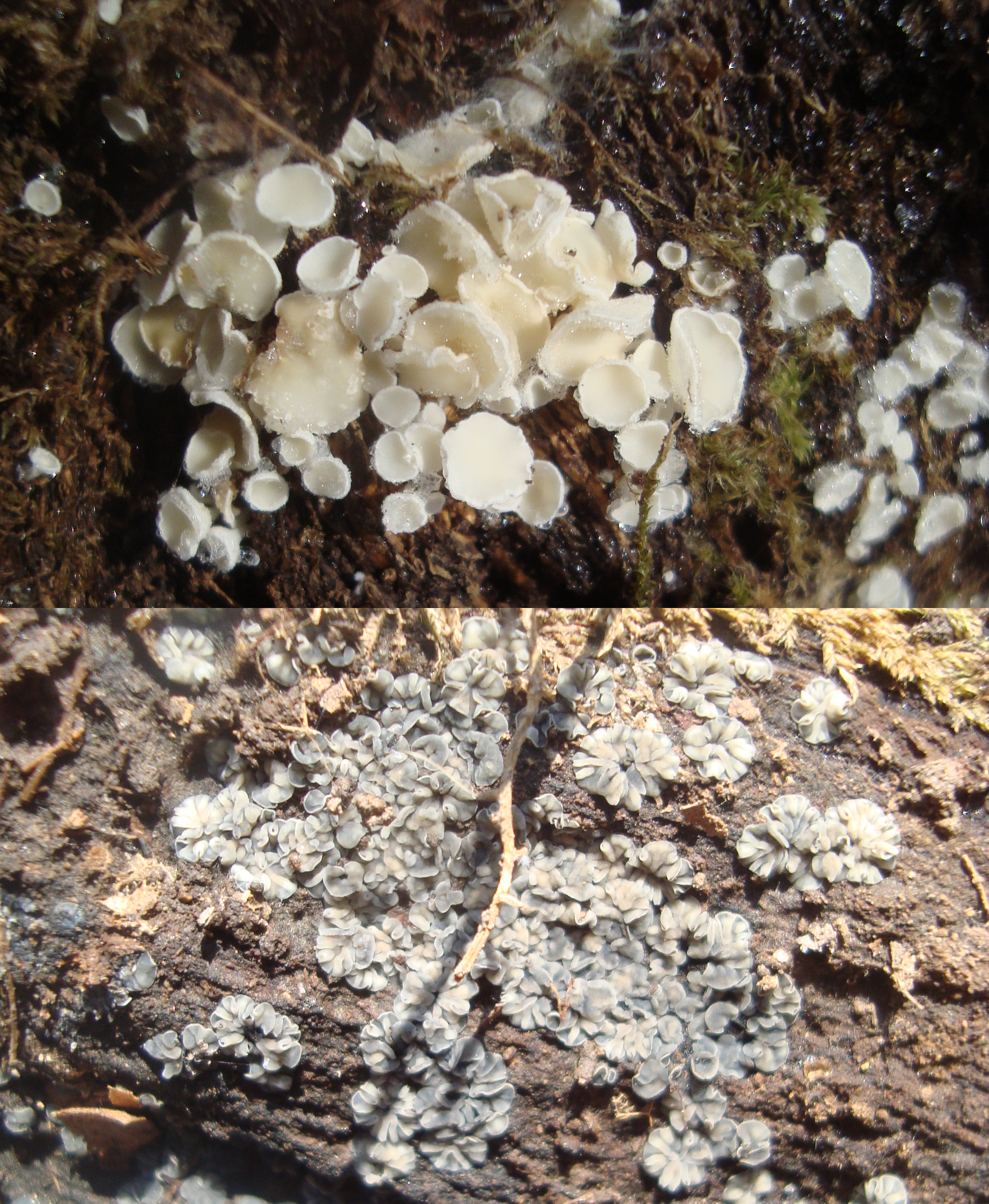
- Tapesia fusca

Scientific classification
- Kingdom: Fungi
- Division: Ascomycota
- Class: Leotiomycetes
- Order: Helotiales
- Family: Mollisiaceae
- Genus: Tapesia (Pers.) Fuckel

= Tapesia =

Genus of fungi

Tapesia is a genus of fungi in the family Mollisiaceae. It contains 120 known species but the validity of some is doubtful.

== Species ==
- Tapesia airae Velen.
- Tapesia alba Velen.
- Tapesia amoris Velen.
- Tapesia angelicae Velen.
- Tapesia annae Velen.
- Tapesia apocrypta Rehm
- Tapesia arachnoidea (Schwein.) Sacc.
- Tapesia atrospora Velen.
- Tapesia aurantiaca Velen.
- Tapesia aurata Anon.
- Tapesia avium Velen.
- Tapesia badia Vaček
- Tapesia balsamicola (Peck) Sacc.
- Tapesia bipunctata Velen.
- Tapesia brachycarpa (Speg.) Gamundí
- Tapesia brevispora Velen.
- Tapesia bromeliacearum Dennis
- Tapesia byssina Fuckel
- Tapesia byssiseda (Fr.) Sacc.
- Tapesia callunae Velen.
- Tapesia caricina Velen.
- Tapesia caricis-firmae Nograsek & Matzer
- Tapesia carnosa Velen.
- Tapesia carpathica Velen.
- Tapesia caulium Fuckel
- Tapesia centaureae Velen.
- Tapesia chlorotica (Fr.) Fuckel
- Tapesia cinerea Velen.
- Tapesia cinerella Rehm
- Tapesia citrinopigmentosa Svrek, 1993
- Tapesia citrinopigmentosa Svrček
- Tapesia clinopodii Velen.
- Tapesia coloradensis Ellis & Everh.
- Tapesia conglomerata Velen.
- Tapesia corni (Fuckel) Sacc.
- Tapesia corticola Velen.
- Tapesia cruenta Henn. & Plöttn.
- Tapesia culcitella (Cooke & Ellis) Sacc.
- Tapesia cytisi Velen.
- Tapesia derelicta Morgan
- Tapesia discincola (Schwein.) Sacc.
- Tapesia dryina Velen.
- Tapesia epicladotricha Sacc.
- Tapesia epithelephora (Saut.) Sacc.
- Tapesia equiseti Velen.
- Tapesia eriophori Velen.
- Tapesia eryngii Velen.
- Tapesia evilescens (P.Karst.) P.Karst.
- Tapesia exigua Velen.
- Tapesia firmula (P.Karst.) Boud.
- Tapesia flavescens Svrek, 1987
- Tapesia flavescens Svrček
- Tapesia foetida Velen.
- Tapesia frangulae Velen.
- Tapesia fusca (Pers.) Fuckel
- Tapesia fuscoatra (Hazsl.) Sacc.
- Tapesia fuscohyalina (Rehm) Remler
- Tapesia gaillardii Roum. & Pat.
- Tapesia globulifera Velen.
- Tapesia gloeocapsae Velen.
- Tapesia griseopulveracea (Schwein.) Sacc.
- Tapesia haloxyli Kravtzev
- Tapesia hirta Velen.
- Tapesia hypoderma Velen.
- Tapesia intermedia Velen.
- Tapesia jaceae Velen.
- Tapesia laburni Velen.
- Tapesia laricina Velen.
- Tapesia lata Rostr.
- Tapesia lateritia (Pers.) Sacc.
- Tapesia legeriana (Gillet) Sacc.
- Tapesia lividofusca (Fr.) Rehm
- Tapesia lutescens Velen.
- Tapesia megaloma (Schwein.) Sacc.
- Tapesia melina Velen.
- Tapesia minima Velen.
- Tapesia mollisioides (Schwein.) Sacc.
- Tapesia moravica Petr.
- Tapesia mortuaria (Ces.) Sacc.
- Tapesia myosotidis Velen.
- Tapesia nigrificans (G.Winter) Boud.
- Tapesia occulta Rehm
- Tapesia ochroleuca Velen.
- Tapesia padi Velen.
- Tapesia parvula Velen.
- Tapesia pezizellaeformis Velen.
- Tapesia pruni-avium (Pers.) Quél.
- Tapesia prunorum (Fr.) Fuckel
- Tapesia pseudosanguinea (Rehm) Sacc.
- Tapesia pseudotapesia Velen.
- Tapesia quercina Vaček
- Tapesia rhois Fairm.
- Tapesia ribicola E.K.Cash
- Tapesia rivularis Svrek, 1987
- Tapesia rubescens Velen.
- Tapesia sambuci Velen.
- Tapesia sarothamni Velen.
- Tapesia scariosa (Berk. & M.A.Curtis) Sacc.
- Tapesia scutelliformis Sacc.
- Tapesia secamenti Fairm.
- Tapesia stipata (Fr.) Sacc.
- Tapesia strobilicola (Rehm) Sacc.
- Tapesia subfusca Velen.
- Tapesia subiculata (Schwein.) Sacc.
- Tapesia succinea Rehm
- Tapesia tenebricosa Velen.
- Tapesia tenebrosa (P.Karst.) Nannf.
- Tapesia torulae Fuckel
- Tapesia tumefaciens Ellis & Everh.
- Tapesia ulicis Grelet
- Tapesia umbrosa (Schrad.) Quél.
- Tapesia undulata Sacc., E.Bommer & M.Rousseau
- Tapesia vaccinii (Rehm) Svrček
- Tapesia variabilispora Svrek, 1993
- Tapesia variabilispora Svrček
- Tapesia versatilis (Fr.) Boud.
- Tapesia villosa Aebi
- Tapesia vincta (Cooke & Peck) Sacc.
- Tapesia viticola (Pers.) Boud.
- Tapesia zarza R.Galán
