= Gérard Daniel Westendorp =

Dutch-born Belgian military physician and botanist

Gérard Daniel Westendorp (8 March 1813, The Hague – 31 January 1869, Dendermonde) was a Dutch born, Belgian military medical doctor and botanist.

He studied medicine at the Ecole de Médecine de Bruxelles, later working as a student-physician in Antwerp. Around 1834, he became a naturalized citizen of Belgium, subsequently serving as an assistant army and navy physician, later spending his career as a "regular doctor" in the Belgian army.

As a botanist, he specialized in cryptogamic flora, being the co-publisher (with A.C.F. Wallays) of a cryptogamic exsiccata series of Belgium. He also made significant contributions towards the "Prodromus Florae Batavae" project (1850–1866). In the field of zoology, he published a treatise on Bryozoa and sponges of Belgium.

Westendorp's botanical specimens are preserved in the Jardin Botanique National de Belgique.

== Selected works ==
- Herbier cryptogamique, ou, Collection des plantes cryptogames et agames qui croissent en Belgique, 1845-1859 (exsiccata series; starting with 1849 together with A.C.F. Wallays).
- Notices sur quelques cryptogames, 1851–1863.
- Polypiers flexibles de la Belgique. Collection des bryozaires, sertulaires, flustres & spongiaires qu'on rencontre en Belgique, et particuliérement aux environs d'Ostende, 1853.
- Les cryptogames : classes d'apres leurs stations naturelles, 1854.
- Description de quelques Cryptogames inédites ou nouvelles pour la flore des deux Flandres, 1863.
