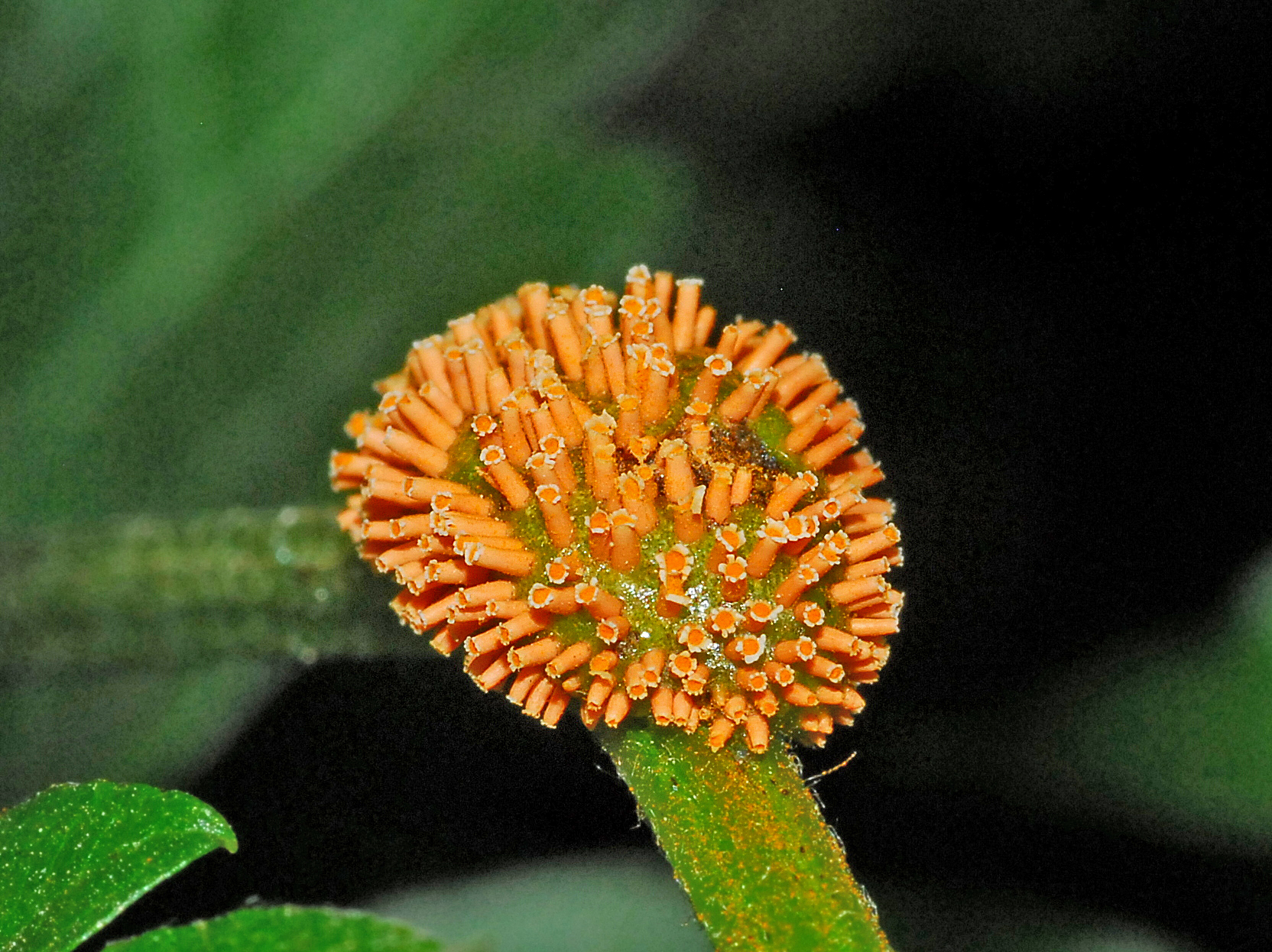
- Puccinia recondita on Clematis vitalba

Scientific classification
- Kingdom: Fungi
- Division: Basidiomycota
- Class: Pucciniomycetes
- Order: Pucciniales
- Family: Pucciniaceae
- Genus: Puccinia
- Species: P. recondita

Binomial name
- Puccinia recondita Roberge ex Desm. (1857)

Synonyms
- List: Aecidium anchusae Erikss. & Henning 1895; Aecidium aquilegiae Pers. 1803; Aecidium asperifolii Pers. 1796; Aecidium asperifolii var. asperifolii Pers. 1796; Aecidium clematidis DC. 1805; Aecidium hellebori E. Fisch. 1904 Puccinia symphyti-bromorum Fr. Müll. 1901; Aecidium ranunculacearum var. aquilegiae Cooke 1871; Aecidium ranunculacearum var. aquilegiae-vulgaris DC. 1815; Aecidium ranunculacearum var. clematidis Cooke 1871; Aecidium ranunculacearum var. thalictri Cooke 1871; Aecidium thalictri Grev. 1823; Caeoma borragineatum Link 1825; Dicaeoma agropyrum (Ellis & Everh.) Kuntze 1898; Dicaeoma aquilegiae (Pers.) Kuntze 1898; Dicaeoma asperifolii (Pers.) Kuntze 1898; Dicaeoma boreale (Juel) Kuntze 1898; Dicaeoma dispersum (Erikss. & Henning) Kuntze 1898; Dicaeoma perplexans (Plowr.) Kuntze 1898; Dicaeoma persistens (Plowr.) Kuntze 1898; Pleomeris agropyrina (Erikss.) Syd. 1921; Pleomeris bromina (Erikss.) Syd. 1921; Pleomeris dispersa (Erikss.) Syd. 1921; Pleomeris perplexans (Plowr.) Syd. 1921; Pleomeris persistens (Plowr.) Syd. 1921; Pleomeris triticina (Erikss.) Syd. 1921 Puccinia agropyri Ellis & Everh. 1892; Puccinia agropyrina Erikss. 1899; Puccinia agrostidis Oudem. 1892; Puccinia asperifolii (Pers.) Wettst. 1885; Puccinia borealis Juel 1894; Puccinia bromina (Fr. Müll.) Z. Urb. & J. Marková 1999; Puccinia cerinthes-agropyrina Gäum. & Terrier 1947; Puccinia dispersa Erikss. & Henning 1894; Puccinia dispersa Erikss. & Henning 1894; Puccinia perplexans Plowr. 1885; Puccinia perplexans var. triticina (Erikss.) Z. Urb. 1967; Puccinia persistens (Ellis & Everh.) J. Marková & Z. Urb. 1998; Puccinia persistens (Erikss.) Z. Urb. & J. Marková 1977 Puccinia persistens var. triticina (Erikss.) Urb.{?} & J. Marková 1977; Puccinia persistens (Erikss.) Z. Urb. & J. Marková 1998; Puccinia persistens Plowr. 1889; Puccinia persistens var. agropyrina (Erikss.) Z. Urb. & J. Marková 1998; Puccinia persistens var. borealis (Juel) J. Marková & Z. Urb. 1998; Puccinia recondita (Plowr.) D.M. Hend. 1961; Puccinia recondita D.M. Hend. 1961; Puccinia recondita D.M. Hend. 1961; Puccinia rubigo-vera (DC.) G. Winter 1881; Puccinia rubigo-vera Mains 1933; Puccinia rubigo-vera Mains 1933; Puccinia secalina Grove 1913; Puccinia straminis; Puccinia triticina Erikss. 1899 Trichobasis rubigo-vera (DC.) Lév. 1849; Uredo rubigo-vera DC. 1815; Uromyces rubigo-vera (DC.) Lév. 1847

= Puccinia recondita =

Species of fungus

Puccinia recondita is a fungus species and plant pathogen belonging to the order of Pucciniales and family Pucciniaceae.

== Distribution ==
This fungal species occurs worldwide.

== Biology ==
It is a heteroecious fungus, macrocyclic, and has five distinct life-stages of development: teliospores, basidiospores, and urediniospores on cereal hosts, and pycniospores and aeciospores on the alternative plant hosts.

== Host ==
These fungi are endoparasites plant pathogens mainly infecting species in the families of Balsaminaceae, Boraginaceae, Hydrophyllaceae, Ranunculaceae and Poaceae (especially wheat and rye). Puccinia recondita was also found to cause 'brown rust' in wheat and triticale (hybrid of wheat and rye). Symptoms of infestation are yellowish to brown spots and pustules on the leaf surfaces of the host plants. Brown rust is the most widespread and prevalent disease of wheat in South America, and is the most important wheat disease in Mexico.

It was originally found on the leaves of a species of Secale (grass) in France.

=== Subspecies and forms ===
- Puccinia recondita f.sp. secalis Miedaner, Klocke, Flath, Geiger & Weber 2012 - causes brown rust of rye.

In Iceland, Puccinia recondita ssp. borealis infects Agrostis canina, Anthoxanthum odoratum, Calamagrostis stricta, Hierochloe odorata and Thalictrum alpinum.

== Gallery ==
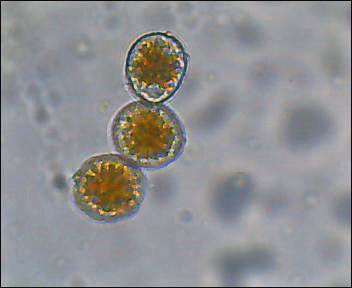
Uredospores

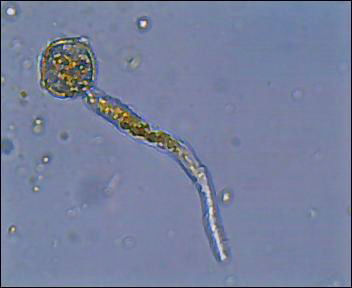
Germinating uredospores

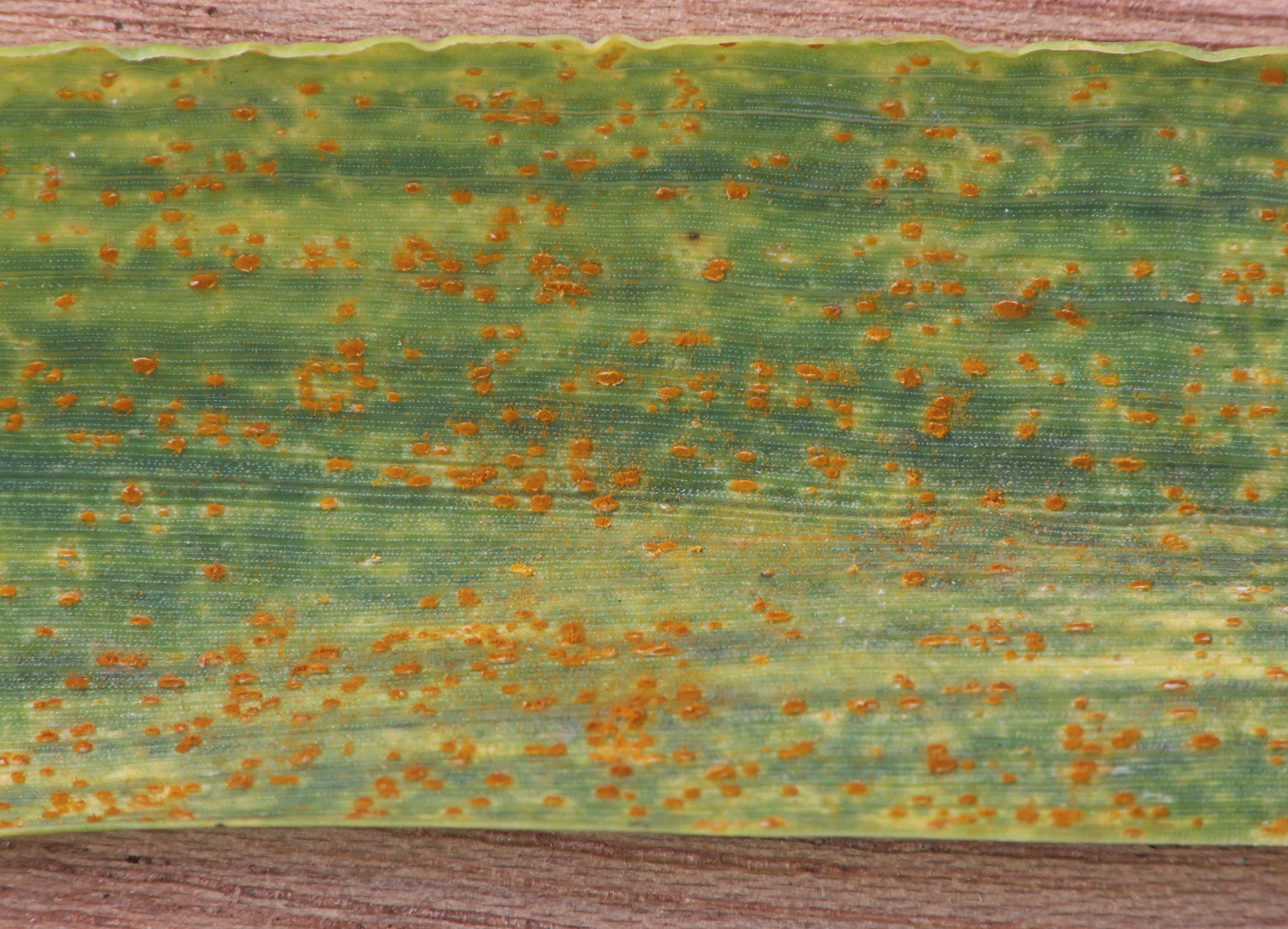
Puccinia recondita f.sp. tritici on Triticum aestivum

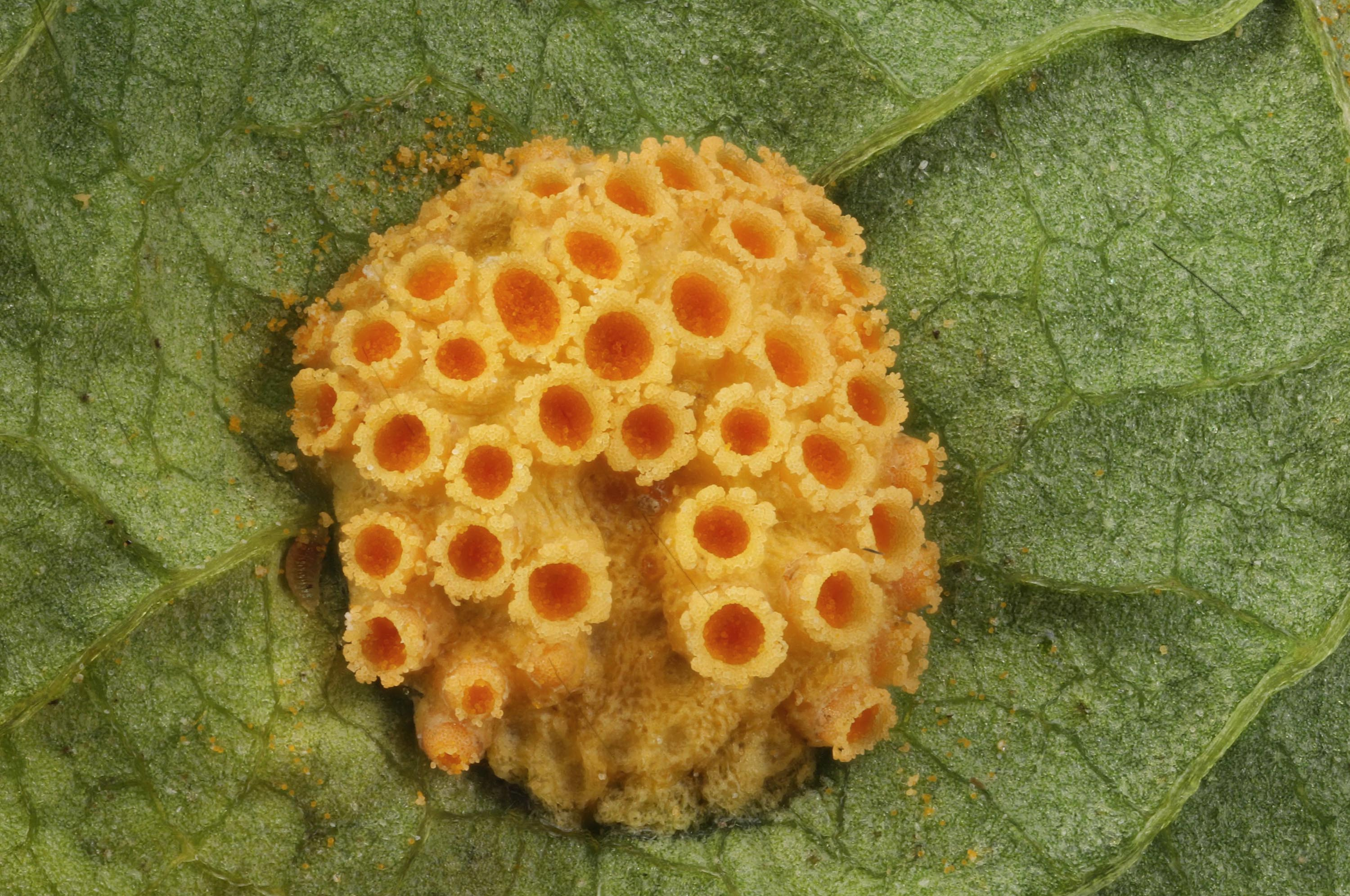
Puccinia recondita on Thalictrum flavum

== See also ==
- List of Puccinia species

== Bibliography ==
- George Baker Cummins: The Rust Fungi of Cereals, Grasses and Bamboos. Springer, Berlin 1971, ISBN 3-540-05336-0.
