= Common root rot (wheat) =

Fungal disease of wheat

Common root rot is a disease of wheat caused by one or more fungi. Cochliobolus sativus, Fusarium culmorum and F. graminearum are the most common pathogens responsible for common root rot.

== Symptoms ==
Small, oval, brown lesions on the roots, lower leaf sheath and subcrown internode. As the disease progresses, lesions may elongate, coalesce and girdle the subcrown internode and may turn from brown to nearly black.

== Crop losses ==
Losses in potential yield from common root rot of wheat were estimated at 5.7% annually over the 3-year period 1969–71 in the Canadian prairie provinces and at 7% annually over the 10-year period 1968–78 ub Saskatchewan, Canada.
