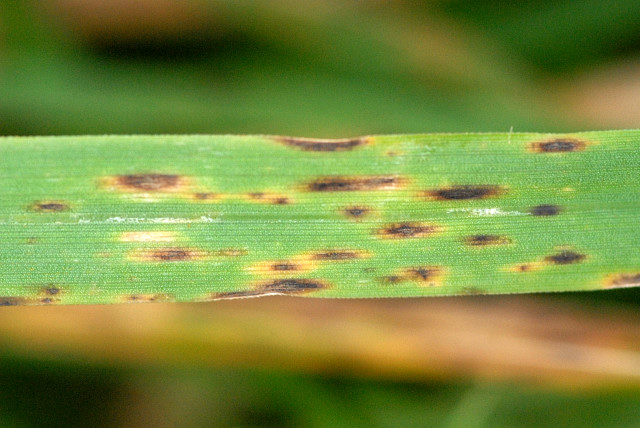
- Symptoms on a wheat leaf

Scientific classification
- Domain: Eukaryota
- Kingdom: Fungi
- Division: Ascomycota
- Class: Dothideomycetes
- Order: Pleosporales
- Family: Pleosporaceae
- Genus: Cochliobolus
- Species: C. sativus

Binomial name
- Cochliobolus sativus (S. Ito & Kurib.) Drechsler ex Dastur (1942)

Synonyms
- Bipolaris californica (Mackie & G.E. Paxton) Gornostaĭ (1978); Bipolaris sorokiniana (Sacc.) Shoemaker (1959); Drechslera sorokiniana (Sacc.) Subram. & B.L. Jain (1966); Helminthosporium acrothecioides Lindf. (1918); Helminthosporium californicum Mackie & G.E. Paxton (1923); Helminthosporium sativum Pammel, C.M. King & Bakke (1910); Helminthosporium sorokinianum Sacc. (1890); Ophiobolus sativus S. Ito & Kurib. (1929)

= Cochliobolus sativus =

Species of fungus

The fungus Cochliobolus sativus is the teleomorph (sexual stage) of Bipolaris sorokiniana (anamorph) which is the causal agent of a wide variety of cereal diseases. The pathogen can infect and cause disease on roots (where it is known as common root rot), leaf and stem, and head tissue. C. sativus is extremely rare in nature and thus it is the asexual or anamorphic stage which causes infections. The two most common diseases caused by B. sorokiniana are spot blotch and common root rot, mainly on wheat and barley crops.

== Identification ==
The mycelium of B. sorokiniana is usually deep olive-brown. New cultures produce abundant simple conidiophores, which may be single or clustered and measure 6–10 x 110–220 μm with septations. Conidia develop laterally from pores beneath each conidiophore septum. Conidia are olive-brown and ovate to oblong, with rounded ends and a prominent basal scar. They measure 15–28 x 40–120 μm and are 3- to 10-septate. Some may be slightly curved. Their walls are smooth and noticeably thickened at the septa.

The sexual state (C. sativus), when formed in culture, is in the form of black, globose pseudothecia 300–400 μm in diameter, with erect beaks 50–200 μm long. Asci are clavate and measure 20–35 x 150–250 μm. Ascospores are hyaline, uniformly filamentous, and spirally flexed within asci. They measure 5–10 x 200–250 μm and are 4- to 10-septate.

== Host species ==
Agropyron cristatum^{1}, Allium sp. ^{1}, Alopecurus pratensis^{1}, Aneurolepidium chinense^{1}, Avena sativa^{1}

Bromus inermis^{1}, B. marginatus^{1}, B. willdenowii^{1}

Calluna vulgaris^{1}, Chloris gayana^{1}, Cicer arietinum^{1}, Clinelymus dahuricus^{1}, C. sibiricus^{1}, Cynodon dactylon^{1}, C. transvaalensis^{1}

Dactylis glomerata^{1}

Echinochloa crus-galli^{1}, Elymus junceus^{1}

Festuca sp. ^{1}

Guzmania sp. ^{1}

Hordeum brevisubulatum^{1}, H. distichon^{1}, H. sativum var. hexastichon^{1}, H. vulgare^{1}, H. vulgare var. hexastichon^{1}

Lablab purpureus^{1}, Linum usitatissimum^{1}, Lolium multiflorum^{1}

Pennisetum typhoides^{1}

Roegneria semicostata^{1}

Saccharum sp. ^{1}, Secale cereale^{1}, Setaria italica^{1}, Sorghum sp. ^{1}

Taraxacum kok-saghyz^{1}, Trisetum aestivum^{1}, Triticum aestivum^{1}, T. secale^{1}, T. turgidum subsp. durum, T. vulgare^{1}

Zea mays^{1}

=== Notes ===
1. USDA ARS Fungal Database

== Geographical distribution ==
Cochliobolus sativus has a world-wide distribution.

Geographical distribution
Africa	Kenya,^{1} Malawi,^{1} Sudan,^{1} South Africa, ^{1} Tanzania, ^{1} Zimbabwe^{1}
Australasia	Australia,^{1} China, ^{1} Korea, ^{1} India, ^{1} Indonesia, ^{1} New Zealand,^{1} Papua New Guinea,^{1} Taiwan, ^{1} Thailand^{1}
Central America	Cuba, ^{1} Mexico, ^{1} Nicaragua^{1}
Europe	Austria, ^{1} Belgium, ^{1} Czechoslovakia, ^{1} Denmark, ^{1} Finland, ^{2} Germany, ^{1} Greece, ^{1} Hungary, ^{1} Italy, ^{1} Poland, ^{1} Scotland, ^{1} United Kingdom, ^{1} USSR
North America	Canada (Alberta, ^{1} Manitoba, ^{1} Saskatchewan^{1}) US (Indiana, ^{1} Kansas, ^{1} Minnesota, ^{1} Montana, ^{1} New York, ^{1} North Dakota, ^{1} South Dakota, ^{1} Utah, ^{1} Virginia^{1})
South America	Argentina, ^{1} Brazil^{1}

=== Notes ===
1. USDA ARS Fungal Database 2.

== Main diseases ==
Common root rot (barley); Common root rot (wheat); spot blotch (barley); Spot blotch (wheat)

== Spot blotch of wheat ==
This is most important disease in non-tradition wheat growing areas. The B. sorokiniana comes with Pyrenophora tritici-repentis and causes millions of tons of wheat loss each year. The symptoms are blotch as well as induced senescence due to premature chlorophyll losses Rosyara et al., 2007.
