= Wheat leaf rust =

Fungal disease of wheat, most prevalent

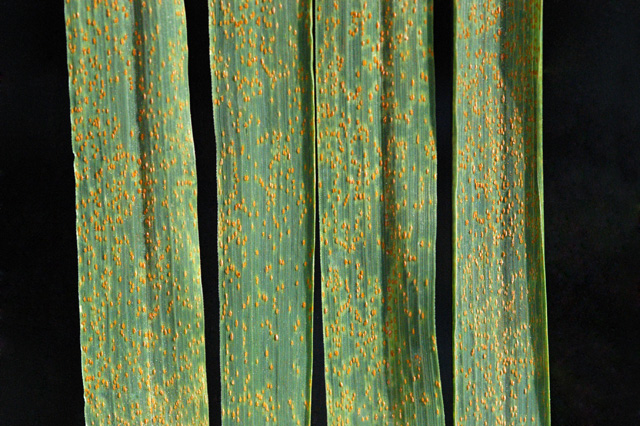
- Symptoms
- Common names: Brown rust Leaf rust
- Causal agents: Puccinia triticina
- Hosts: wheat
- EPPO Code: PUCCRT
- Distribution: Worldwide

Wheat leaf rust

Scientific classification
- Kingdom: Fungi
- Division: Basidiomycota
- Class: Pucciniomycetes
- Order: Pucciniales
- Family: Pucciniaceae
- Genus: Puccinia
- Species: P. triticina

Binomial name
- Puccinia triticina Erikss. (1899)

Synonyms
- Puccinia dispersa f. sp. tritici Erikss. & E.Henn. 1894; Puccinia recondita f. sp. tritici (Eriks. & E.Henn.) D.M.Henderson

Wheat leaf rust (Puccinia triticina) is a fungal disease that affects wheat, barley, rye stems, leaves and grains. In temperate zones it is destructive on winter wheat because the pathogen overwinters. Infections can lead up to 20% yield loss. The pathogen is a Puccinia rust fungus. It is the most prevalent of all the wheat rust diseases, occurring in most wheat-growing regions. It causes serious epidemics in North America, Mexico and South America and is a devastating seasonal disease in India. P. triticina is heteroecious, requiring two distinct hosts (alternate hosts).

== Host resistance ==
Plant breeders have tried to improve yield quantities in crops like wheat from the beginning of agriculture. From the 20th century, breeding for resistance against disease proved to be as important for total wheat production as breeding for increase in yield. The use of a single resistance gene against various pests and diseases plays a major role in resistance breeding for cultivated crops. The earliest single resistance gene was identified as effective against yellow rust. Numerous single genes for leaf rust resistance have since been identified.

Leaf rust resistance gene is an effective adult-plant resistance gene that increases resistance of plants against P. recondita f.sp. tritici (UVPrt2 or UVPrt13) infections, especially when combined with genes Lr13 and gene Lr34 (Kloppers & Pretorius, 1997). Lr37 originates from the French cultivar VPM1 (Dyck & Lukow, 1988). The line RL6081, developed in Canada for Lr37 resistance, showed seedling and adult-plant resistance to leaf, yellow and stem rust. Crosses between the French cultivars will therefore introduce this gene into local germplasm, raising the genetic variation of South African cultivars.

Molecular techniques have been used to estimate genetic distances among different wheat cultivars. With the genetic distances known predictions can be made for the best combinations concerning the two foreign genotypes carrying gene Lr37, VPMI and RL6081 and local South African cultivars. This is especially important in wheat with its low genetic variation. The gene will be transferred with the least amount of backcrossing to cultivars genetically closest to each other, generation similar genetic offspring to the recurrent parent, but with gene Lr37 present. Genetic distances between near isogenic lines (NILs) for a particular gene will give an indication of how many loci, amplified with molecular techniques, need to be compared to locate putative markers linked to the gene.

== Nomenclatural history ==
The Puccinia species causing wheat leaf rust has been called by at least six different names since 1882, when G. Winter (1882) described the Puccinia rubigo-vera. During this time, wheat leaf rust was interpreted as a specialized form of P. rubigo-vera. Later, Eriksson and Henning (1894) classified the fungi as P. dispersa f.sp. tritici. In 1899, Eriksson concluded that the rust should be considered a separate authentic species. Due to this, he described the fungi as P. triticina. This name was used by Gauemann (1959) in his comprehensive book about rust fungi of middle Europe.

Mains (1933) was among the first scientists to use a species name with a broad species concept for wheat leaf rust. He considered P. Rubigo-vera a current name and posited that 32 binomials were synonyms of that species. George Baker Cummins and Ralph Merrill Caldwell (1956) built off the broad species concept and also discussed the validity of P. rubigo-vera, which was based on a uredinial-stage basionym. Finally, they introduced P. recondita as the oldest valid name for grass-based rusts, including wheat leaf rust. Their idea and publication was followed by Wilson & Henderson (1966) in another comprehensive rust flora (viz. British Rust Flora). Wilson and Henderson (1966) also used a broad species concept for P. recondita and divided this broad species into 11 different formae speciales. The accepted name for wheat leaf rust in their flora was P. recondita f.sp. tritici. Cummins (1971), in his rust monograph for Poaceae, introduced an ultra-broad species concept for P. recondita and listed 52 binomials as its synonyms.

A stream of thought opposite to broad morphologically-based concepts also gained traction among uredinologists. This idea was introduced into the classification of graminicolous rust fungi by Urban (1969), who believed a taxonomic name should reflect both morphology and ecology of a species. In his paper, Urban introduced P. perplexans var. triticina as an appropriate name for wheat leaf rust. Savile (1984) was also among the uredinologists who believed in narrowing the species concept. He considered P. triticina as an authentic taxonomic name for wheat leaf rust. Meanwhile, as his research continued Urban considered morphological, ecological, and field experiences while studying wheat leaf rust, coming to consider the fungi as a part of the species Puccinia persistens with its aecial stage on Ranunculaceae members, totally different from P. recondita, which produces its aecial stage on Boraginaceae family members. His final name for this rust was P. persistens subsp. triticina. Molecular and morphological studies proved Urban's taxonomy for wheat leaf rust to be correct.

== Life cycle ==
Wheat leaf rust spreads via airborne spores. Five types of spores are formed in the life cycle: Urediniospores, teliospores, and basidiospores develop on wheat plants and pycniospores and aeciospores develop on the alternate hosts. The germination process requires moisture, and works best at 100% humidity. Optimum temperature for germination is between 15 and 20 °C (59 and 68 °F). Before sporulation, wheat plants appear completely asymptomatic.

=== Primary hosts ===
Wheat (Triticum aestivum), durum (T. turgidum var. durum), domesticated emmer (T. dicoccon) and wild emmer (T. dicoccoides), Aegilops speltoides, jointed goatgrass (Ae. cylindrica), and triticale (X Triticosecale).

=== Secondary hosts ===
Several of the Ranunculaceae serve as alternate hosts, but rarely. This does not occur with the same frequency as with stem rust and barberry. (Note: p. 5, "Wheat leaf rust has alternate hosts in the buttercup family...") Thalictrum speciosissimum (synonym T. flavum glaucum) and Isopyrum fumaroides.

==== Thalictrum flavum ====
P. triticina has an asexual and sexual life-cycle phase. To complete its sexual phase, P. triticina requires a second host (Thalictrum flavum glaucum) on which it will overwinter. In places where Thalictrum does not grow, such as Australia, the pathogen will only undergo its asexual life cycle and will overwinter as mycelium or uredinia. The germination process requires moisture and temperatures between 15 and 20 °C (59 and 68 °F). After around 10–14 days of infection, the fungi will begin to sporulate and the symptoms will become visible on the wheat leaves.

== Epidemiology ==
Location is an important characteristic in the spread of wheat rust. In some places wheat rust can easily flourish and spread. In other areas, the environment is marginally suited for the disease. Urediniospores of the wheat rusts initiate germination within one to three hours of contact with free moisture over a range of temperatures depending on the rust. Urediniospores are produced in large numbers and can be blown considerable distances by the wind, but most urediniospores are deposited close to their source under the influence of gravity. Urediniospores are relatively resilient and can survive in the field away from host plants for periods of several weeks. They can withstand freezing if their moisture content is lowered to 20 to 30 percent. Viability rapidly decreases at moisture contents of more than 50 percent. Long-distance spread of urediniospores is influenced by wind patterns and by the latitude. In general, spores move west to east due to the winds resulting from the rotation of Earth. At progressively higher latitudes, winds tend to become more southerly in the Northern Hemisphere and more northerly in the Southern Hemisphere. Puccinia triticina can survive the same environmental conditions as the wheat leaf, provided infection but no sporulation has occurred. The fungus can infect in less than three hours in the presence of moisture and temperatures below 20 °C (68 °F); however, more infections occur with longer exposure to moisture.

=== North American races ===
For the 2020 season, USDA ARS's Cereal Disease Laboratory found 36 races in North America: BBBQD, LBDSG, LCDJG, LCDSG, MBDSD, MBTNB, MCDSB, MCDSD, MCJSB, MCTNB, MLPSD, MNPSD, MPPSD, MPTSD, MSBJG, TBBGS, TBBJS, TBRKG, TBTDB, TBTNB, TCBGS, TCGJG, TCJTB, TCSQB, TCTBB, TCTNB, TCTQB, TDBGS, TFPSB, TFTSB, TGBGS, TNBGJ, TNBGS, TNBJJ, TNBJS, and TPBGJ.

=== Europe ===
==== Northern Europe ====
Between 1992 and 2002, of the most common cultivars in Northern European production, almost all provided seedling resistance against most pathotypes. About 1/3 of these cultivars were confirmed to carry as-yet unidentified Lrs. A few cultivars were resistant to most pathotypes, and one to all of them. The most common Lrs were: Lr13, Lr14a, and Lr26, with Lr2a, Lr3, Lr10, Lr17, and Lr23 occurring rarely. A few particular cultivars were extremely popular, 'Ritmo' for example being >50% of hectares/acreage in 1998 and 99. Across the entire surveyed period (92-02) the most popular were: ‘Pepital’ (Lr10+Lr13), ‘Haven’ (Lr26), ‘Hussar’ (Lr26), ‘Ritmo’ (Lr13), ‘Lynx’ (Lr17+Lr26), ‘Kris’ (Lr10+Lr13), ‘Terra’ (Lr13), ‘Sleipner’ and ‘Hereward’. (For spring wheat specifically, ‘Dragon’ (Lr14a), ‘Leguan’ (Lr14a) and ‘Vinjett’ (Lr14a).)

== Symptoms ==
Small brown pustules develop on the leaf blades in a random scatter distribution. They may group into patches in serious cases. Onset of the disease is slow but accelerated in temperatures above 15 °C (59 °F), making it a disease of the mature cereal plant in summer, usually too late to cause significant damage in temperate areas. Losses of between 5 and 20% are normal but may reach 50% in severe cases. Symptoms can range in severity from barely aesthetic to completely overrun on the leaf surface. On barberry leaf the disease appears as powdery yellow spots with aecia being dispersed from the underside of the leaf.

== Control ==
Varietal resistance is important. Fungicides are commonly used. (Note: p. 7, "Fungicides are widely used against leaf rust...") Chemical control with triazole fungicides may be useful for control of infections up to ear emergence but is difficult to justify economically in attacks after this stage. Control often is not as common as prevention through the development of genetically-resilient varieties and the removal of common barberry. Cultivars are the best method of controlling the disease and have been utilized for over 100 years. However, resistance linked to single genes has been made ineffective by the pathogen adapting to new cultures. This is why destruction of alternate hosts is key to control. Early-maturing cultivars as well as spring wheat should be sown as early as possible to avoid peak rust periods. Self-sown wheat (volunteers) should be destroyed as not to further spread urediniospores at the end of harvest.

=== Resistance genes ===
- Lr21 - Scofield et al., 2005 successfully used virus-induced gene silencing to investigate how this gene works in hexaploid wheat.

Because Lr34, Lr46, and Lr67 are non-specific, they should not be used in race analysis of this pathogen.

Even the use of varieties with gene stacks has often failed against Pt/Prt due to individual deployment of the same genes in other varieties in the same area. Slow rusting may be the answer.

== See also ==
- List of Puccinia species
- Wheat diseases
- Rust (fungus)
- Rice blast
- Stem rust
- Kharchia wheat
