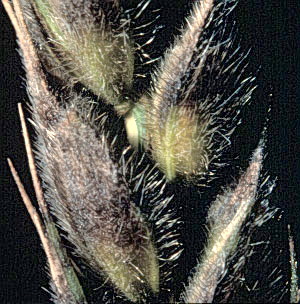
- Necrosis on wheat

Scientific classification
- Kingdom: Fungi
- Division: Ascomycota
- Class: Dothideomycetes
- Order: Pleosporales
- Family: Phaeosphaeriaceae
- Genus: Phaeosphaeria
- Species: P. nodorum

Binomial name
- Phaeosphaeria nodorum (E.Müll.) Hedjar. (1969)

Synonyms
- Depazea nodorum Berk. (1845); Hendersonia nodorum (Berk.) Petr. (1947); Leptosphaeria nodorum E.Müll. (1952); Septoria glumarum Pass. (1879); Septoria nodorum (Berk.) Berk. (1845); Stagonospora nodorum (Berk.) E.Castell. & Germano (1977); Parastagonospora nodorum (Berk.) Quaedvlieg, Verkley & Crous. (2013)

= Phaeosphaeria nodorum =

Species of fungus

Phaeosphaeria nodorum (syn. Stagonospora nodorum, synonym and correct taxonomic name: Parastagonospora nodorum) is a major fungal pathogen of wheat (Triticum aestivum), causing the disease Septoria nodorum blotch. It is a member of the Dothideomycetes, a large fungal taxon that includes many important plant pathogens affecting all major crop plant families.

== Disease cycle ==
The infection occurs in repeated cycles of both asexual and sexual infection throughout the growing season. New rounds of infection are initiated by rain-splash or wind dispersal of spores. Infection begins when spores land on leaf tissue. The spores rapidly germinate to produce long, branching threadlike structures, called hyphae. The hyphae invade the leaf, using specialised branches to gain entry to the outermost layer of cells on the leaves. They can also grow directly through pores in the leaves. The hyphae rapidly colonize the leaves and begin to produce asexual fruiting bodies.

== Management ==
=== Seed treatment ===
Seed treatment with fungicide - already used for bunts and smuts - has been discovered to eliminate seed transmission in wheat.

== Model organism ==
Parastagonospora nodorum is an experimentally tractable organism, which is easily handled in defined media. It was one of the first fungal pathogens to be genetically manipulated. Parastagonospora nodorum has been a model for fungicide development and emerged as a model for dothideomycete pathology.

== Genetics and genomics ==
=== Genomic resources ===
Parastagonospora nodorum has been sequenced and annotated by the Broad Institute.

=== Genetics ===
Genes for signal transduction factors are vital to the infection process. Functional genomics investigations by the Solomon group have dissected the roles of several, by disabling them and observing how they fail. In Solomon et al., 2005 & Solomon et al., 2006 they demonstrate how sporulation, pathogenicity, and stress tolerance are centrally related to several kinases, Mak2 (a MAP kinase) and Cpk1, Cpk2, and Cpk3 (calmodulin kinases).

== Taxonomy ==
In 2013, Quaedvlieg et al. introduced a new combination for this species: Parastagonospora nodorum (Berk.) Quaedvlieg, Verkley & Crous. In the article named "Sizing up Septoria" they showed that the type of the fungal genus Stagonospora (Stagonospora paludosa) actually clustered inside the Massarinaceae and not in the Phaeosphaeriaceae as was previously assumed. They also showed that the type of the genus Phaeosphaeria (P. oryzae) does not cluster near Stagonospora nodorum. This means that both the Phaeosphaeria and Stagonospora names for this species are wrong. This caused that the Phaeosphaeriaceae located genus previously known as Stagonospora, incorporating several important pathogens on grasses (e.g. Stagonospora nodorum and S. avenae), was subsequently renamed into Parastagonospora with Parastagonospora nodorum being the type of this genus.
