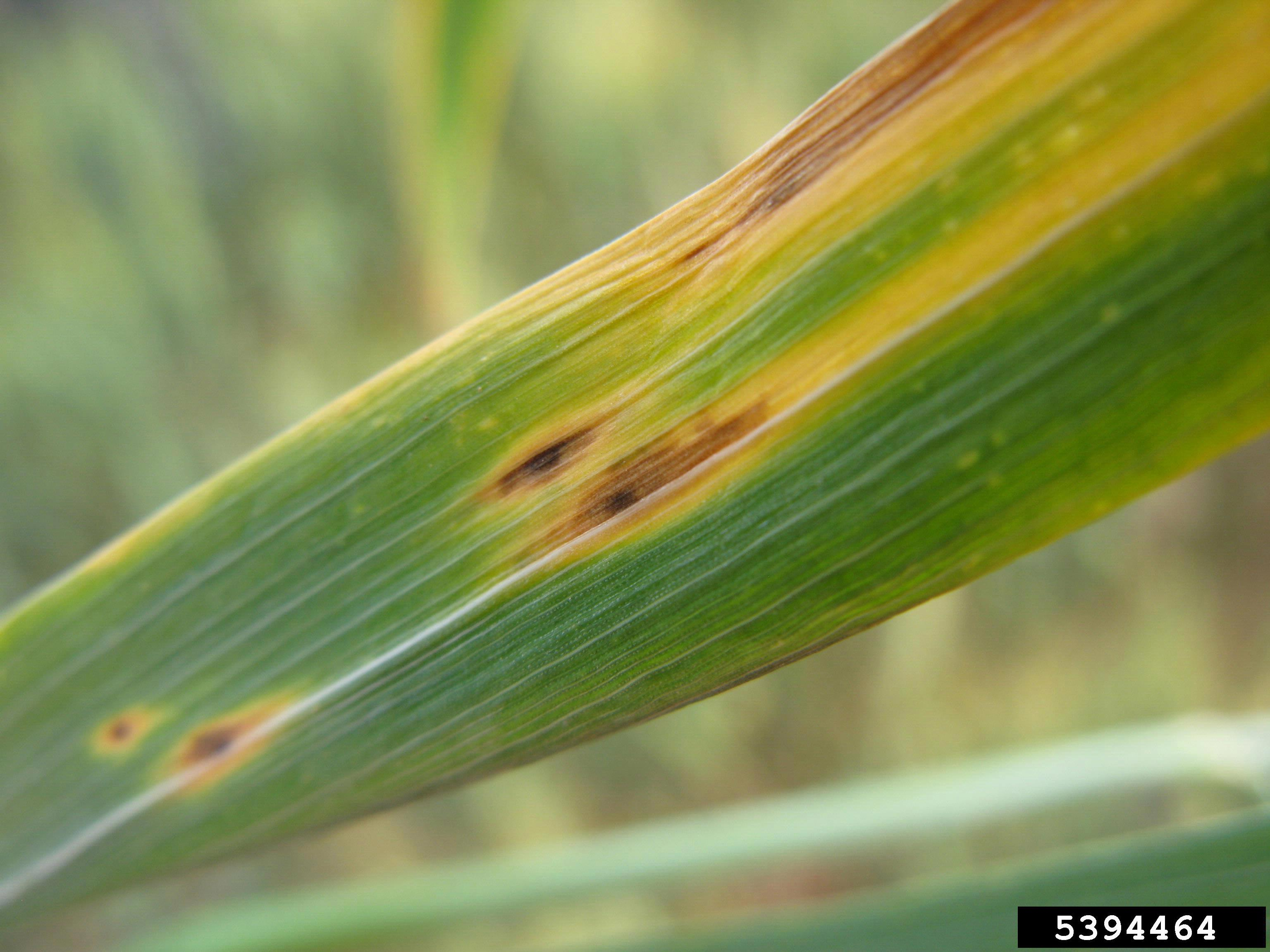

Scientific classification
- Kingdom: Fungi
- Division: Ascomycota
- Class: Dothideomycetes
- Order: Pleosporales
- Family: Pleosporaceae
- Genus: Pyrenophora
- Species: P. tritici-repentis

Binomial name
- Pyrenophora tritici-repentis (Died.) Drechsler, (1923)

Synonyms
- Drechslera tritici-repentis Drechslera tritici-vulgaris Helminthosporium gramineum f.sp. tritici-repentis Helminthosporium tritici-repentis Helminthosporium tritici-vulgaris Pleospora culmorum Pleospora sarcocystis Pleospora trichostoma Pyrenophora tritici-vulgaris Pyrenophora sarcocystis Pyrenophora trichostoma Pyrenophora tritici-vulgaris Sphaeria culmorum Sphaeria sarcocystis Sphaeria trichostoma

= Pyrenophora tritici-repentis =

Species of fungus

Pyrenophora tritici-repentis (teleomorph) and Drechslera tritici-repentis (anamorph) is a necrotrophic plant pathogen of fungal origin, phylum Ascomycota. The pathogen causes a disease originally named yellow spot but now commonly called tan spot, yellow leaf spot, yellow leaf blotch or helminthosporiosis. At least eight races of the pathogen are known to occur based on their virulence on a wheat differential set.

The tan (yellow) spot fungus was first described by Nisikado in 1923 in Japan. and was later identified in Europe, Australia and the US, in the mid 1900s. The disease is one of the most important fungal disease on wheat and the fungal pathogen is found to infect in all parts of the world wherever wheat and other susceptible host crops are found. P. tritici-repentis overwinters on stubble, and due to recent heavily no-till/residue retention cultural practices, increased incidence and yield loss of up to 49% has been witnessed if ideal conditions occur. It forms characteristic, dark, oval-shaped spots of necrotic tissue surrounded by a yellow ring. It is responsible for losses that account for up to 30% of the crop, due to its effects reducing photosynthesis. Pathogenesis and toxicity in P. tritici-repentis is controlled by a single gene, transformations of this gene cause the pathogen to become benign when interacting with wheat. This has major implications for those in agriculture seeking to combat the effects of this fungus.

== Hosts and symptoms ==
Tan spot is found primarily on wheat, but is also found to infect other cereals and grasses including triticale, barley, and rye, but are less frequently affected. Other grass species affected by the pathogen include Siberian wheat grass, sand bluestem, meadow brome, sheep fescue, June grass, little bluestem, green foxtail, needle and thread, and tall wheatgrass. While these are not necessarily agriculture crop hosts such as wheat, the pathogen is able to form and survive on many grass hosts, which can eventually venture into wheat fields. Other important grass susceptible hosts include smooth brome which can be found in pastures, as well as quack grass that is found in the environment and considered a weed in many agricultural crops. Lesions typically appear on both upper and lower leaf surfaces, and initially are tan to brown specks. Eventually, the tan to brown specks expand to larger irregular, oval, lens-shaped, ellipse, tan blotches with a yellow ring around them. The yellow ring is often referred to as a halo, yellow discoloration as chlorosis, and browning/death of leaf tissue as necrosis. The development of a dark brown to black spot in the center the lesion is characteristic of the disease. If warmer temperatures and moist conditions persist, spores known as conidia will move up plant as secondary inoculum and can also infect head/spikes. Symptoms on the head are indistinct, but can cause brownish glumes, and grains can have a reddish appearance similar to the pathogen Fusarium.

== Disease cycle ==
P. tritici-repentis survives and overwinters as pseudothecia on stubble from the previous year's infected crop. The pseudothecia contain ascospores (sexual spores). Such ascospores produced are large and typically dispersed by wind, but do not travel far due to their size. The ascospores land on leaf surfaces and begin to produce lesions by infection from appressorium and infection peg. The lesions initially formed by ascospores, known as condo, form atop of conidiophores, and can serve as primary inoculum to new plant/host via long distance wind dispersal. Condo can also serve as primary inoculum via rain splash to further more up primary host and re-infect. During and after maturation of the wheat crop, fungus can grow saprophytically as mycelium from the infected leaf blade, down the leaf sheath, and on to the stem where it will later form a pseudothecia. The disease develops over a wide temperature range, but is favored by warmer temperatures along with or followed by long rains, dew, or irrigation.

== Environment ==
The fungus requires 6-24+ hours of moisture to infect a leaf. This means that rain, significant dew or high canopy humidity are factors that can lead to infection. Optimal temperatures for symptom development range from 60–82 °F (16–28 °C).

== Control ==
Since this disease can cause considerable yield loss, effective control is very important. The most effective method of long term control is crop rotation. There is a considerable difference in the fungal population after one year of rotation. Examples of non-host crops include mustard, flax, and soybean. Some other control options include tillage. Foliar fungicides can also be used as control methods. Since the top two leaves contribute the most to yield, it is important to protect them. Some effective fungicides include, but are not limited to, Headline, Quilt, and Stratego. There are however, resistant varieties that make most methods of control unnecessary. There is research to suggest that plant height may also influence the amount of disease able to form due to the pathogen. It suggests that shorter plants will have a lowered chance of infection. This research has only been conducted in Canada however, and should lead to more research before being used as a control technique.

Out of all wheat pathogens, Ptr is among the best studied. Among all necrotrophic pathogens of this crop, Ptr's and Parastagonospora nodorum's effectors have become the best studied.

=== Host resistance ===
Some resistance genes – especially against races 1 and 5, the most problematic in Kazakhstan – have been identified.

== Importance ==
This disease is considered to be a very important one. According to the University of Nebraska, losses of 50 percent have been documented. This negatively impacts the profitability a farmer can hope to achieve within one year. Tan spot is recognized as "one of the major constraints of wheat production. This is also a very significant disease in Canada, creating similar yield losses annually. Tan spot is important enough and causing large enough yield losses to continually prompt new research. P. t-r. has caused serious epidemics in Kazakhstan since the 1980s with nearly half the national harvest being lost when there is an epidemic.
