= Leaf rust =

Several members of the order Pucciniales are commonly called leaf rusts:

- Wheat leaf rust caused by Puccinia triticina
- Hemileia vastatrix which causes Coffee leaf rust
- Leaf rust (barley) or barley leaf rust or brown rust or barley brown rust...
  - ... or its causative agent Puccinia hordei
- Phakopsora euvitis commonly known as Asian grapevine leaf rust
