= Bacterial leaf streak =

Bacterial wheat disease

Bacterial leaf streak (BLS), also known as black chaff, is a common bacterial disease of wheat. The disease is caused by the bacterial species Xanthomonas translucens pv. undulosa. The pathogen is found globally, but is a primary problem in the US in the lower mid-south and can reduce yields by up to 40 percent.^{[6]} BLS is primarily seed-borne (the disease is transmitted by seed) and survives in and on the seed, but may also survive in crop residue in the soil in the off-season. During the growing season, the bacteria may transfer from plant to plant by contact, but it is primarily spread by rain, wind and insect contact. The bacteria thrives in moist environments, and produces a cream to yellow bacterial ooze, which, when dry, appears light colored and scale-like, resulting in a streak on the leaves. The invasion of the head of wheat causes bands of necrotic tissue on the awns, which is called Black Chaff.^{[14]} The disease is not easily managed, as there are no pesticides on the market for treatment of the infection. There are some resistant cultivars available, but no seed treatment exists. Some integrated pest management (IPM) techniques may be used to assist with preventing infection although, none will completely prevent the disease.^{[2]}

== Host and symptoms ==
Bacterial leaf streak is a pathogen known to infect and damage wheat varieties. The pathogen has also been known to infect other small grain all cereal crops such as rice, barley and triticale. The strains of the pathogen are named differently according to the species they infect. It is one of the most destructive diseases in rice.^{[15]} Resistant wheat cultivars offer the best protection against yield loss, but little is known about the inheritance of resistance.^{[12]} The disease is most common on wheat and can be found on winter and summer wheat varieties.

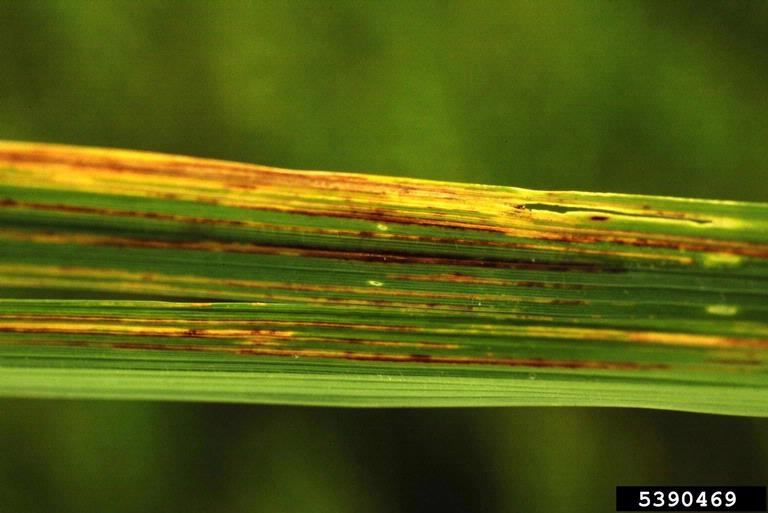
Leaf streak and lesion symptoms of Bacterial Leaf Streak

Symptoms of this pathogen can be seen on the stem, leaves, and glumes. Stem symptoms are not always present, but can be seen as a dark brown to purple discoloration on the stem below the head and above the flag leaf. ^{[14]} In the early stages of the disease, translucent water soaked streaks can be seen on the leaves often accompanied by a shiny glaze or clumps of dried bacteria on the leaf surface. ^{[8]} These markings turn to brown lesions after just a few days, and may be surrounded by a lime green halo. Lesions can stretch the entire leaf blade. BLS exhibits similar symptoms to those of Septoria nodorum, a common fungal infection. A common sign that will distinguish this pathogen from Septoria nodorum is the lack of spores on the leaves, which appears as tiny black spots on the leaf surface with a Septoria infection. A cream to yellow colored bacterial ooze produced by BLS infected plant parts is also a distinguishing sign of the pathogen.^{[7]} Infected glumes, known as black chaff, are darkened and necrotic. Severe symptoms will result in kernels that are discolored due to black and purple streaks. ^{[9]} Plants infected with bacterial leaf streak will exhibit an orange cast from leaf symptoms and suffer yield and quality loss.^{[14]}

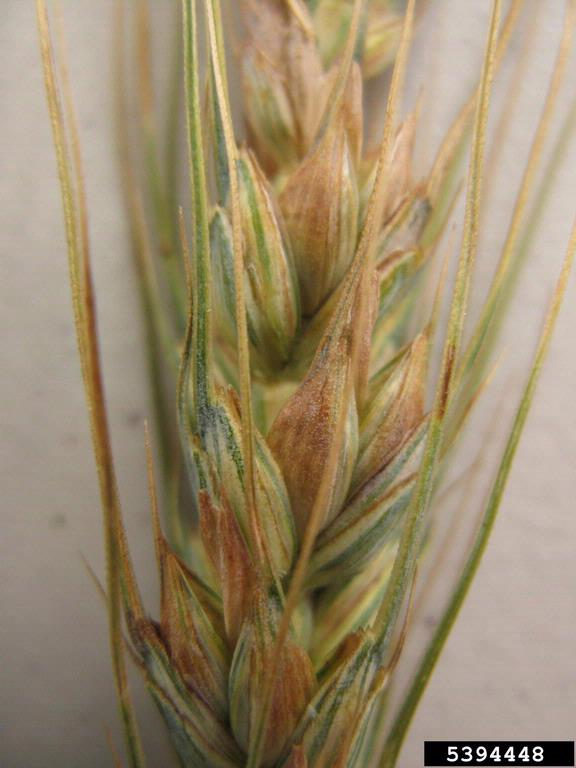
Black Chaff symptoms shown on wheat plant

== Disease cycle ==
Bacterial leaf streak of wheat is a seed-borne disease and is primarily transported by seed, but can also be transmitted by plant-to-plant contact within its lifecycle. Epidemics are typically observed late in the growing season and in wet environments. Moisture facilitates the release of the pathogen from the inoculated seed, which leads to leaf colonization and invasion of tissue. Bacteria on the moist leaf surface enter through leaf openings, such as the stomata or wounds. Under moderately warm weather conditions (15-30 degrees Celsius) bacteria will begin to release and multiply in the plant parenchyma tissue.^{[4]} The bacteria then inject a number of effector proteins into the plant with a Type 3 Secretion System (T3SS)^{[5]}. The T3SS effectors in Xanthomonas are Transcription Activator-like effectors (TAL effectors). These TAL effectors activate the production of plant genes that are beneficial to bacterial infection.^{[1]} The bacteria spreads and progresses vertically up the plant.^{[3]} The bacterial masses cause elongated streaks along the veins of the plant. Water collection on leaves also leads to the spread of the organism, increasing the number of lesions on leaves. Rain, wind, insects, and plant-to-plant contact may spread the disease in the season and cause reinfection.^{[4]} After the plant is harvested or dies, the bacteria may overwinter in the soil; although, its survival rate is much greater when crop debris is present. However, the bacteria cannot survive on decomposing matter alone and free bacteria cannot survive for more than 14 days in hot dry weather.^{[7]} Bacteria is primarily spread by infected or contaminated seed.^{[10]} In some cases, the bacterial will overwinter on other perennial plants and weeds.^{[4]} Residual bacteria in the soil, debris or other plants may also cause new infection in clean seed.

== Environment ==
The disease can tolerate warm or freezing temperature,^{[2]} but favorable conditions for the disease include wet and humid weather. Irrigated fields provide a favorable environment for the disease.^{[14]} The disease has become quite prevalent in semi-tropical regions, but can found all over the world where wheat is grown.^{[13]} Strong winds that blow soils help contribute to the spread of disease. When the spread is initiated by wind blown soil particles, symptoms will be found most readily towards the edges of the field.^{[6]}

== Management of BLS ==
Bacterial leaf streak of wheat is not easily prevented, but can be controlled with clean seed and resistance. Some foliar products, such as pesticides and antibiotic compounds, have been tested for effectiveness, but have proven to have insignificant outcomes on the bacterial pathogen. Using clean seed, with little infection, has yielded effective results for researchers and producers. The pathogen, being seed-borne, can be controlled with the elimination of contaminated seed. However, clean seed is not always a sure solution. Because the pathogen may still live in the soil, the use of clean seed is only effective if both the soil and seed are free of the pathogen. Currently, there are no successful seed treatments available for producers to apply to wheat seed for the pathogen. Variety resistance is another option for control of the disease. Using cultivars such as Blade, Cromwell, Faller, Howard or Knudson, which are resistant to BLS may reduce the impact of the disease and potentially break the disease cycle. Avoiding susceptible cultivars such as Hat Trick, Kelby, and Samson may also reduce the presence of the disease and reduce the amount of bacterial residue in the soil.^{[6]} Using integrated pest management techniques such as tillage to turn over the soil and bury the infection as well as rotating crops may assist with disease management, but are not a definitive control methods.^{[9]} Depending on conditions, the bacteria may survive for up to 81 months.^{[4]} Because the bacteria is moisture driven, irrigation may also increase the risks of BLS infection.^{[8]}

== Importance ==
Bacterial leaf streak is a major bacterial disease of wheat. Yield losses are normally less than 10%, but can be up to 40%. The loss in yield is due to lower weight of the seed rather than lack of production. Risk of damages due to bacterial leaf streak is variable, but should not be overlooked because there is always a chance of an epidemic. Research is still being done on the pathogen, specifically on finding resistant strains. Farmers should avoid planting susceptible cultivars, and avoid infected seed in order to ensure there will be no infection of the pathogen.^{[4]} This disease can survive in freezing to warm climates, threatening wheat populations throughout the world.

== Sources ==
- Boch, Jens; Bonas, Ulla (2010). "Xanthomonas AvrBs3 Family-Type III Effectors: Discovery and Function". Annual Review of Phytopathology. 48: 419–36. doi:10.1146/annurev-phyto-080508-081936. PMID 19400638.
- Boehm D. "Understanding Bacterial Diseases in Wheat." AgriPro: Syngenta. <http://www.smallgrains.org/2009conf/bacterialdiseaseswheatboehm.pdf%5B%5D>
- Dean, Paul. "Functional Domains and Motifs of Bacterial Type III Effector Proteins and Their Roles in Infection." FEMS Microbiology Reviews (2011): 1000-125.Federation of European Microbiological Societies. Web. 4 Dec. 2014. <http://onlinelibrary.wiley.com/store/10.1111/j.1574-6976.2011.00271.x/asset/j.1574-6976.2011.00271.x.pdf?v=1&t=i39g1k19&s=599f77ee47c941f8ed7303d9c003f5419b16b44d>.
- Duveiller E., Bragard C., and Maraite H. "Bacterial Leaf Streak and Black Chaff." FAO Corporate Document Repository. <http://www.fao.org/docrep/006/y4011e/y4011e0n.htm>
- Gardiner, Donald M.; Upadhyaya, Narayana M.; Stiller, Jiri; Ellis, Jeff G.; Dodds, Peter N.; Kazan, Kemal; Manners, John M. (2014). "Genomic Analysis of Xanthomonas Translucens Pathogenic on Wheat and Barley Reveals Cross-Kingdom Gene Transfer Events and Diverse Protein Delivery Systems." Ed. Turgay Unver". PLOS ONE. 9 (1) E84995. doi:10.1371/journal.pone.0084995. PMC 3887016. PMID 24416331.
- Hershman D.E. and Bachi P.R. "Wheat Bacterial Streak/Black Chaff." (2010) University of Kentucky Extension Service. <https://web.archive.org/web/20141208162124/http://www2.ca.uky.edu/agcollege/plantpathology/ext_files/PPFShtml/ppfsagsg2.pdf>
- Lindbeck, Kurt. INDUSTRY BIOSECURITY PLAN FOR THE GRAINS INDUSTRY. N.p.: Plant Health Australia, n.d. Plant Health Australia. June 2011. Web. 4 Dec. 2014.
- McMullen M. and Adhikari T. "Bacterial Leaf Streak and Black Chaff of Wheat." (2011) NDSU Extension Service Plant Disease Management. <http://www.ag.ndsu.edu/pubs/plantsci/smgrains/pp1566.pdf >
- McMullen, M.P., and Lamey, H.A. 1997. Symptoms and controls of crop diseases. NDSU Extension Bulletin PP-533
- Mehta, Yeshwant Ramchandra. "Spike Diseases Caused by Bacteria." Wheat Diseases and Their Management. London: Springer International, 2014. 105-115. Print.
- Smith, M. "Small Grains Disease Update." (2013). University of Minnesota. <https://web.archive.org/web/20160314042208/https://www.ag.ndsu.edu/smallgrains/presentations/2013-best-of-the-best-in-wheat-and-soybean/smith>
- Tillman B.L. and Harrison S.A. "Heritability of Resistance to Bacterial Streak in Winter Wheat." (1996) Crop Science: Vol. 36 No. 2, p. 412-418. <https://www.crops.org/publications/cs/abstracts/36/2/CS0360020412?search-result=1>
- Tillman B.L., Harrison S.A., Russin J.S. and C. A. Clark. "Relationship between Bacterial Leaf Streak and Black Chaff Symptoms in Winter Wheat."(1996) Crop Science: Vol. 36 No. 1, p. 74-78. <https://www.crops.org/publications/cs/abstracts/36/1/CS0360010074?search-result=1>
- Wegulo S.N. "Black Chaff." University of Nebraska, Plant Disease Central (2013). <https://pdc.unl.edu/agriculturecrops/wheat/blackchaff >
- Xie X, Chen Z, Cao J, Guan H, Lin D, et al. (2014) Toward the Positional Cloning of qBlsr5a, a QTL Underlying Resistance to Bacterial Leaf Streak, Using Overlapping Sub-CSSLs in Rice" PLoS ONE 9(4): e95751. <http://www.plosone.org/article/info%3Adoi%2F10.1371%2Fjournal.pone.0095751>
