= Leaf rust (barley) =

Fungal disease of barley

Leaf rust of barley
- Common names: Brown rust
- Causal agents: Puccinia hordei
- Hosts: barley

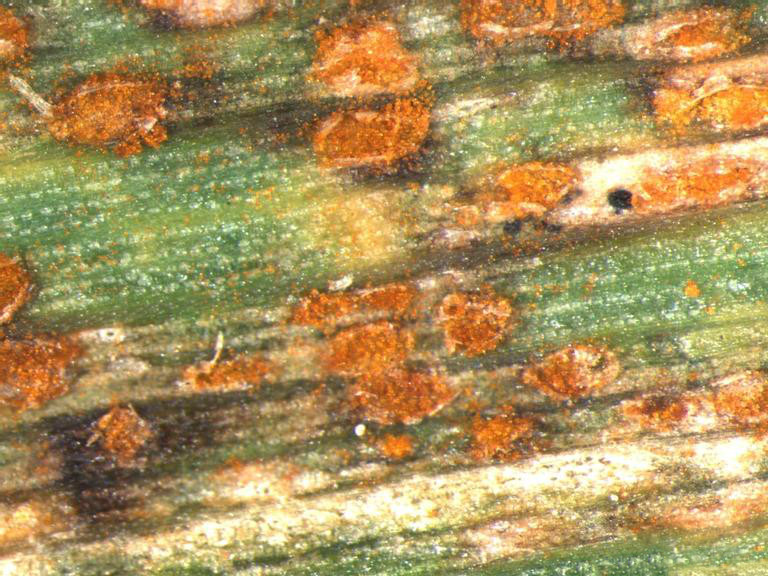
Barley leaf rust

Leaf rust is a fungal disease of barley caused by Puccinia hordei. It is also known as brown rust and it is the most important rust disease on barley.

== Symptoms ==
Pustules of leaf rust are small and circular, producing a mass of orange-brown powdery spores. They appear on the leaf sheaths and predominantly on the upper leaf surfaces. Heavily infected leaves die prematurely.

== Crop losses ==
Leaf rust of barley is considered a relatively minor disease in the United States. However, sporadic outbreaks have occurred in the southeastern and Midwestern regions of the country.

== Pathotypes and host resistance ==
Most of the barley cultivars grown in the United States are susceptible to Puccinia hordei. Nineteen seedling resistance genes (i.e. Rph1 to Rph19) have been identified, but only three (Rph3, 7 and 9) have been deployed in commercial cutlivars worldwide. In the United States, the Rph7 gene effectively controlled the disease for over twenty years. However, in 1993, pathotypes with virulence to the Rph7 resistance gene were identified in Virginia, California, and Pennsylvania. Recently, the first simply inherited gene conferring adult plant resistance to leaf rust in barley was designated Rph20. Rph20 originated from the two-rowed barley landrace H. laevigatum (i.e., Hordeum vulgare subsp. vulgare); parent of the Dutch cultivar 'Vada' (released in the 1950s). To date there have been no reports of an Rph20-virulent pathotype.

== See also ==
- Barley bacterial blight
- Hemileia vastatrix - leaf rust affecting coffee plants
