= Bacterial blight (barley) =

Disease of barley caused by a bacterial pathogen

Bacterial blight is a disease of barley caused by the bacterial pathogen Xanthomonas campestris pv. translucens (syn. X. translucens). It has been known as a disease since the late 19th century. It has a worldwide distribution.

== Symptoms ==
The disease is characterized by small, pale green spots or streaks which soon appear water-soaked. The lesions expand and then appear as dry dead spots. The lesions elongate into linear streaks which may eventually extend the full length of the leaf. Lesions rarely occur on the leaf sheath or culm. In severe infections, a milky gray exudate may be squeezed from the cut end of leaf exhibiting symptoms. Brown spots on the margin of the cotyledon characterized plants

== Disease cycle ==
This disease is caused by a common bacterium that persists in soil and water and is spread by wind-driven rains. The bacteria overwinters on crop residue, seed, fall-sown cereals, and perennial grasses. Spring infection may result from any of these sources. Subsequent infections are spread by splashing of bacterial ooze by rain drops, plant to plant contact and insects.

Bacterial blight develops on the upper leaves of during periods of cool, wet weather, after the plants have reached the boot stage. Leaf blight is associated with high relative humidity, wet weather, and cool spring temperatures (15–25 degrees C or 60–75 degrees F). Warm, dry weather stops the disease and new emerging leaves may be relatively free of bacterial infection.

== Crop loss ==
Although detailed studies have not been conducted, damage to the flag often occurs suggesting that yield losses may reach 10–15%.

== Management ==
Disease incidence and severity is reducing by rotating to non-grain crops, burying crop residue and using disease free seed. No resistant cultivars are known, some are more susceptible than others.
