= Drought tolerance in barley =

Barley (Hordeum vulgare) is known to be more environmentally-tolerant than other cereal crops, in terms of soil pH, mineral nutrient availability, and water availability. Because of this, much research is being done on barley plants in order to determine whether or not there is a genetic basis for this environmental hardiness.

== Effect of drought on barley plants ==
Barley is a C_{4} species and a monocot, and therefore the effects drought has on it can be extrapolated to other plant species. Drought is often the result of increased temperature in a region, which promotes water loss in plants by increased transpirational pull. Lack of water in the soil decreases mineral nutrient availability, as minerals must be dissolved in soil solution in order to enter the roots. Additionally, drought results in decreased photosynthetic rates, decreased biomass, and accelerated leaf senescence.

== Significance ==
Barley has been an invaluable crop for humans since the birth of the Fertile Crescent. Prior to the mass cultivation of maize (Zea mays), wheat (Triticum aestivum) and rice (Oryza sativa), barley was the main cereal crop for humans. Today, barley is primarily used for animal feed (55-60%) and malt (30-40%). Many developing countries still rely heavily on barley as a food source, especially in regions of Africa, the Arabian Peninsula, and South America. A decline in barley production would therefore worsen the ongoing food crises in these countries. CO_{2} levels have increased by 48% since the Industrial Revolution (1760-2019), raising global temperatures. This has resulted in an increase in extreme weather events, such as drought, in many regions of the world which contain valuable farming land. Overall, climates are erratically changing, and one foreseeable way to combat global food insecurity is to breed crops which are tolerant to environmental stresses.

== Mechanisms ==
=== C_{4} photosynthesis ===
Barley plants photosynthesize via the C_{4} pathway, meaning they fix CO_{2} into a 4-carbon organic acid, which is then shuttled to the bundle sheath, preventing diffusion back into the atmosphere. The C_{4} pathway uses PEP-carboxylase as a catalyst for carbon fixation, rather than RuBisCO, which is used in the C3 pathway. PEP-carboxylase has a higher affinity for CO_{2}, and does not have affinity for O_{2}, which prevents photorespiration. Overall, the C_{4} pathway allows barley plants to fix carbon more efficiently, thus allowing them to keep their stomata open for less time, preventing water loss by transpiration.

=== Abscisic acid ===
Abscisic acid (ABA) is the hormone which plants release in response to stress. It induces stomatal closure in plants, decreasing water loss by transpiration. However, increased stomatal closure results in decreased CO_{2} assimilation. Perhaps to combat this in the short-term, ABA synthesis also promotes elongation of root cells, which in turn promotes mineral nutrient uptake. Other research has also shown that ABA increases carbonic anhydrase activity under drought conditions.

=== Increased root growth ===
Certain varieties of barley plants produce larger root systems. A larger root system improves tolerance to drought by not only increasing the surface area for mineral nutrient absorption, but also by improving the ability of plants to reach deep ground water.

=== Increased antioxidant production ===
Barley plants grown under drought stress exhibit higher activity of antioxidant enzymes, which prevent oxidative damage from reactive oxygen species. Plants are at increased risk of cellular damage when exposed to drought stress due to increased production of reactive oxygen species, and therefore this increased antioxidant activity likely aids in protecting the plant under drought stress.

=== Reduced stomatal density ===
Studies have shown that reduced stomatal density in barley plants does not decrease grain yield despite decreasing gas exchange. A decrease in number of stomata improves drought tolerance by simply inhibiting water escape, thus enhancing water-use efficiency.

=== Decreased nitric oxide levels ===
Barley plants grown under drought stress also exhibit decreased levels of nitric oxide, which studies have shown increased polyamine production. Polyamines aid in plant wellbeing during drought stress by stabilizing cellular structures, such as DNA and membranes, thus prolonging survival.

== Genetic basis ==
Recent research has shown that barley is highly variable in its genotypes concerning drought tolerance, in both wild and cultivated varieties. Indeed, quantitative trait loci (QTLs) have been associated with barley seed germination in drought conditions. As well, varieties grown in more arid climates exhibit better regulation of reactive oxygen species than varieties grown in cooler climates. Traits which would be favourable and unfavourable in drought conditions have been found to exist in barley plants, suggesting that the agricultural industry could plausibly select for drought-resistant traits in barley plants to grow in warmer regions, and the opposite for cooler regions in order to maximize yield.

Identifying the genes responsible for drought tolerance in barley plants and applying them to other plant species or other barley varieties via transgenics has also shown promising results. One study expressed the hva1 gene from barley in creeping bentgrass, and found that it improved drought tolerance by lessening the effects of water-deficit damage. Similarly, transgenic Basmati rice plants containing an hva1 gene from barley exhibited higher drought tolerance than control plants. Other research finds that expression of the HvMYB1 gene in barley is increased under drought stress, and when over-expressed in transgenic barley plants, was found to increase drought tolerance. Induced over-expression of K^{+} transporters in barley plants has also been found to increase drought tolerance, due to the many roles K^{+} plays in plant metabolism and physiology, such as stomatal aperture.

== See also ==
- Amaranth
- Millet
