= Phakopsora euvitis =

Scientific classification
- Domain: Eukaryota
- Kingdom: Fungi
- Division: Basidiomycota
- Class: Pucciniomycetes
- Order: Pucciniales
- Family: Phakopsoraceae
- Genus: Phakopsora
- Species: P. euvitis

Binomial name
- Phakopsora euvitis Y.Ono

Species of fungus

Phakopsora euvitis is a rust fungus that causes disease of grape leaves. This rust fungus has been seen in regions including: Eastern Asia, Southern Asia, Southwestern Brazil, the Americas, and northern Australia. It is widely distributed in eastern and southern Asia but was first discovered on grapevines in Darwin, Australia in 2001 and was identified as Asian grapevine leaf rust by July 2007.

== Hosts and symptoms ==
The host range of P. euvitis includes the plant species Meliosma species (Meliosmaceae) and Vitis species (Vitaceae).

=== Meliosma species (Meliosmaceae) ===
The symptoms of P. euvitis consist of pale yellowish lesions on the surface of leaves on Meliosma spp. leaves.

Signs include the observed on the underside of the leaf, which are tiny orange-brown dots that are actually spermagonia. Over time, they all eventually turn to a blackish color and undergo plasmogamy, developing into aecium. The aecium formed can be observed on the underside of the leaves as a yellow, orange-colored dome-shaped structure.

=== Vitis species (Vitaceae) ===
Symptoms include powdery orange masses on the lower surface of leaves. They often mature into a long columnar shape retaining the same color. The uredinial-telial stages of P. euvitis causes chlorotic and necrotic lesions ranging in shapes and sizes on the upper surface of leaves.

Signs can be seen to those corresponding to areas on the lower surface of the leaves that have densely packaged pustules containing yellow, orange spores. Premature defoliation and dormancy of the telia can occur. In the case of dormancy, telia are formed after uredinia characterized as crust-like and an orange-brown color that form around uredinia or separately from them that eventually become a dark brown-blackish color.

== Disease cycle ==
Phakopsora euvitis is able to persist year-round by the production of urediniospores and infection of Vitis plants. If the alternate host M. myriantha is not present, the uredinia of P. euvitis will only be present.

This disease cycle includes the alternate host.

Teliospores on the grapevines germinate and produce thin-walled basidiospores that are carried by wind or other methods of dispersal to leaves or parts of the plant tissues of M. myriantha (alternate host). After 7–15 days the basidiospores will produce spermagonia. Production of asexual spores in aecia will also occur on the surfaces of the leaves after another 7–14 days. Those aecia will then produce aeciospores. The aeciospores are dispersed to Vitis spp., which is the telial host of this rust fungus. Infected grape leaves give rise to uredinia and disperse urediniospores, usually by wind, back to the aecial host M. myriantha. Later in the season teleia develop near uredinia on the leaf. This allows for the fungus to overwinter as telia, or in some regions persist solely in the uredinial state without a need for an alternate host. Mycelium may survive unfavorable conditions in dormant buds that can lead to future infection cycles.

== Management ==
Australia was the first country to take action and spread awareness of P. euvitis and placed this rust fungus on their Northern Australian Quarantine Strategy (NAQS) list of targeted plant pathogens. They also implemented a public awareness campaign, specifically in Northern Australia, that-in turn- created additional reports on the extent of this rust. Eradication efforts began in 2001 by the means of chemical control and breeding host resistant plants. For the chemical management side eight fungicides tested to observe which had the greatest impact on P. euvitis. Propiconazole, tebuconazole and azoxystrobin that, provided the most significant reduction in disease incidence. As for host resistance, 15 genotypes were tested for resistance against P. euvitis. Rookstock cultivars were the most resistant exhibiting a hypersensitive response to infection and yielding low numbers of small uredinia.
