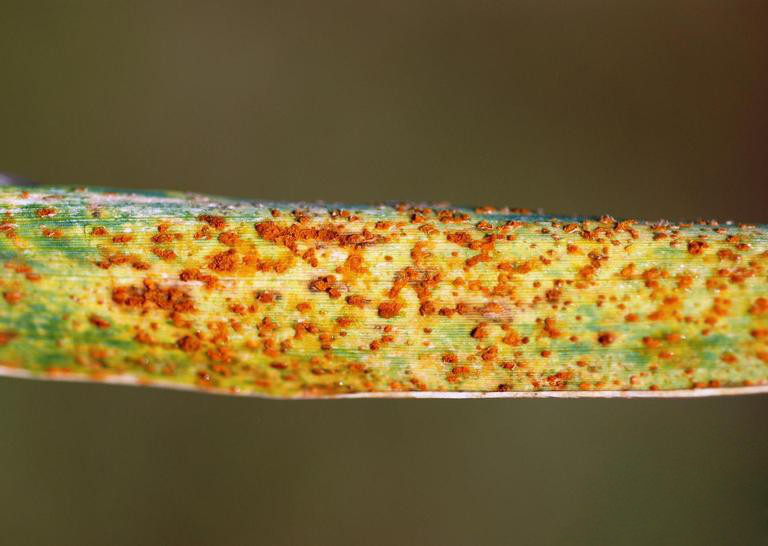

Scientific classification
- Domain: Eukaryota
- Kingdom: Fungi
- Division: Basidiomycota
- Class: Pucciniomycetes
- Order: Pucciniales
- Family: Pucciniaceae
- Genus: Puccinia
- Species: P. hordei

Binomial name
- Puccinia hordei G.H.Otth (1871)

Synonyms
- See § Synonyms

= Puccinia hordei =

Species of fungus

Puccinia hordei is a species of rust fungus. A plant pathogen, it can cause leaf rust of barley, also known as brown rust of barley. It was originally found on the dry leaves of Hordeum vulgare in Germany.

== Taxonomy ==
=== Synonyms ===
- Aecidium ornithogaleum
- Dicaeoma anomalum
- Dicaeoma holcinum
- Dicaeoma hordei
- Nielsenia hordei
- Nigredo hordeina Arthur
- Nigredo hordei (Kuntze) Arthur
- Pleomeris holcina
- Pleomeris hordei
- Pleomeris simplex
- Pleomeris triseti
- Puccinia anomala
- Puccinia fragosoi
- Puccinia holcina
- Puccinia hordei
- Puccinia hordei-murini
- Puccinia loliina
- Puccinia recondita f.sp. holci
- Puccinia recondita f.sp. holcina
- Puccinia recondita f.sp. triseti
- Puccinia recondita f.sp. tritici
- Puccinia schismi
- Puccinia schismi var. loliina
- Puccinia simplex
- Puccinia straminis var. simplex
- Puccinia triseti
- Puccinia vulpiae-myuri
- Puccinia vulpiana
- Uromyces hordei

== Host resistance ==
At the time of Johnston et al., 2013's discovery of severe susceptibility in Golden Promise, this was considered to be the most susceptible variety in the world. Soon thereafter however, Yeo et al., 2014 found SusPtrit was slightly worse. These results alter the meaning of such a basic term as "fully susceptible" to brown rust.

In 2007 several resistance genes for this pathogen including receptor-like kinase (RLK), WIR1, WIR1 homologues, peroxidases, superoxide dismutase and thaumatin were found in barley.
