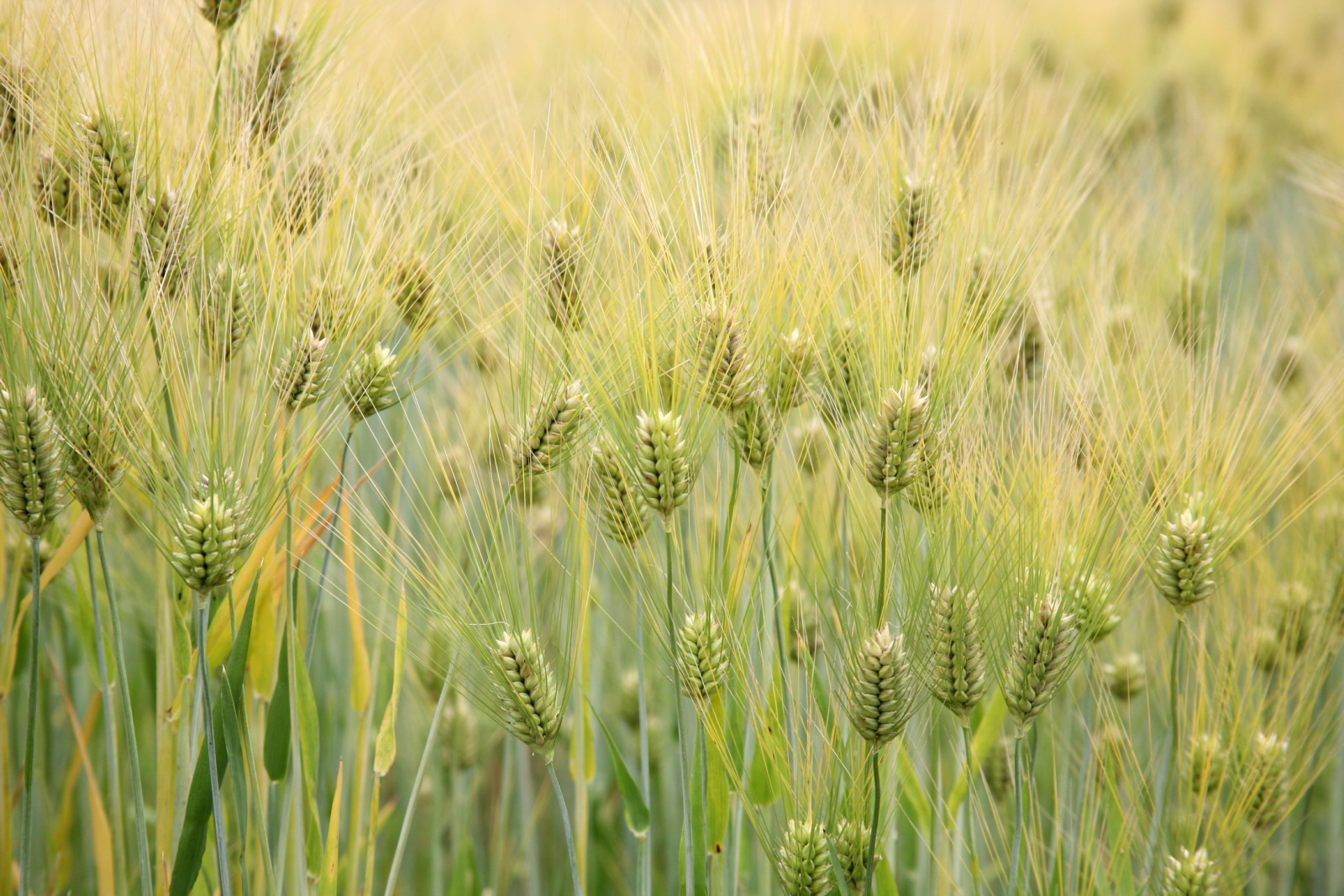

Scientific classification
- Kingdom: Plantae
- Clade: Tracheophytes
- Clade: Angiosperms
- Clade: Monocots
- Clade: Commelinids
- Order: Poales
- Family: Poaceae
- Subfamily: Pooideae
- Genus: Hordeum
- Species: H. vulgare

Binomial name
- Hordeum vulgare L.

Synonyms
- List: Frumentum hordeum E.H.L.Krause nom. illeg.; Frumentum sativum E.H.L.Krause; Hordeum aestivum R.E.Regel nom. inval.; Hordeum americanum R.E.Regel nom. inval.; Hordeum bifarium Roth; Hordeum brachyatherum R.E.Regel nom. inval.; Hordeum caspicum R.E.Regel nom. inval.; Hordeum coeleste (L.) P.Beauv.; Hordeum daghestanicum R.E.Regel nom. inval.; Hordeum defectoides R.E.Regel nom. inval.; Hordeum durum R.E.Regel nom. inval.; Hordeum elongatum R.E.Regel nom. inval.; Hordeum gymnodistichum Duthie; Hordeum heterostychon P.Beauv. [Spelling variant]; Hordeum hexastichon L.; Hordeum hibernaculum R.E.Regel nom. inval.; Hordeum hibernans R.E.Regel nom. inval.; Hordeum himalayense Schult.; Hordeum hirtiusculum R.E.Regel nom. inval.; Hordeum horsfordianum R.E.Regel nom. inval.; Hordeum ircutianum R.E.Regel nom. inval.; Hordeum jarenskianum R.E.Regel nom. inval.; Hordeum juliae R.E.Regel nom. inval.; Hordeum kalugense R.E.Regel nom. inval.; Hordeum karzinianum R.E.Regel nom. inval.; Hordeum kiarchanum R.E.Regel nom. inval.; Hordeum laevipaleatum R.E.Regel nom. inval.; Hordeum lapponicum R.E.Regel nom. inval.; Hordeum leptostachys Griff.; Hordeum macrolepis A.Braun; Hordeum mandshuricum R.E.Regel nom. inval.; Hordeum mandshuroides R.E.Regel nom. inval.; Hordeum michalkowii R.E.Regel nom. inval.; Hordeum nekludowii R.E.Regel nom. inval.; Hordeum nigrum Willd.; Hordeum pamiricum Vavilov nom. inval.; Hordeum parvum R.E.Regel nom. inval.; Hordeum pensanum R.E.Regel nom. inval.; Hordeum polystichon Haller; Hordeum praecox R.E.Regel nom. inval.; Hordeum pyramidatum R.E.Regel nom. inval.; Hordeum revelatum (Körn.) A.Schulz; Hordeum sativum Jess. nom. illeg.; Hordeum sativum Pers. nom. inval.; Hordeum scabriusculum R.E.Regel nom. inval.; Hordeum septentrionale R.E.Regel nom. inval.; Hordeum stassewitschii R.E.Regel nom. inval.; Hordeum strobelense Chiov.; Hordeum taganrocense R.E.Regel nom. inval.; Hordeum tanaiticum R.E.Regel nom. inval.; Hordeum tetrastichum Stokes; Hordeum transcaucasicum R.E.Regel nom. inval.; Hordeum violaceum R.E.Regel nom. inval.; Hordeum walpersii R.E.Regel nom. inval.; Secale orientale Schreb. ex Roth nom. inval.

= Barley =

Cereal grain

Barley (Hordeum vulgare), a member of the grass family, is a major cereal grain grown in temperate climates globally. One of the first cultivated grains, it was domesticated in the Fertile Crescent around 9000 BC, giving it nonshattering spikelets and making it much easier to harvest. Its use then spread throughout Eurasia by 2000 BC. Barley prefers relatively low temperatures and well-drained soil to grow. It is relatively tolerant of drought and soil salinity, but is less winter-hardy than wheat or rye. Wild barley may refer to H. vulgare ssp. spontaneum, but may also refer to other species in the genus Hordeum.

In 2023, barley was fourth among grains in quantity produced, 146 million tonnes, behind maize, rice, and wheat. Globally, 70% of barley production is used as animal feed, while 30% is used as a source of fermentable material for beer, or further distilled into whisky, and as a component of various foods. It is used in soups and stews and in barley bread of various cultures. Barley grains are commonly made into malt using a traditional and ancient method of preparation. In English folklore, John Barleycorn personifies the grain and the alcoholic beverages made from it. English pub names such as The Barley Mow allude to its role in the production of beer.

== Etymology ==
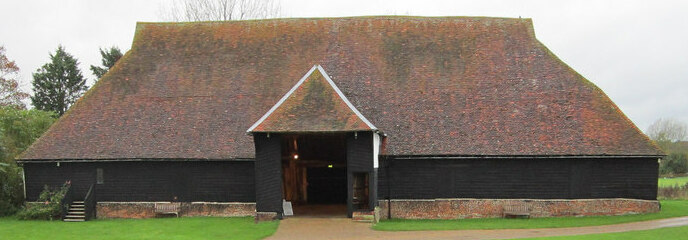
The Barley Barn at Cressing, Essex, built around 1220; its name means "barley barley-store".

The Old English word for barley was bere. This survives in the north of Scotland as bere; it is used for a strain of six-row barley grown there. Modern English barley derives from the Old English adjective bærlic, meaning "of barley". The word barn derives from Old English bere-aern meaning "barley-store". The name of the genus is from Latin hordeum, barley, likely related to Latin horrere, to bristle.

== Description ==
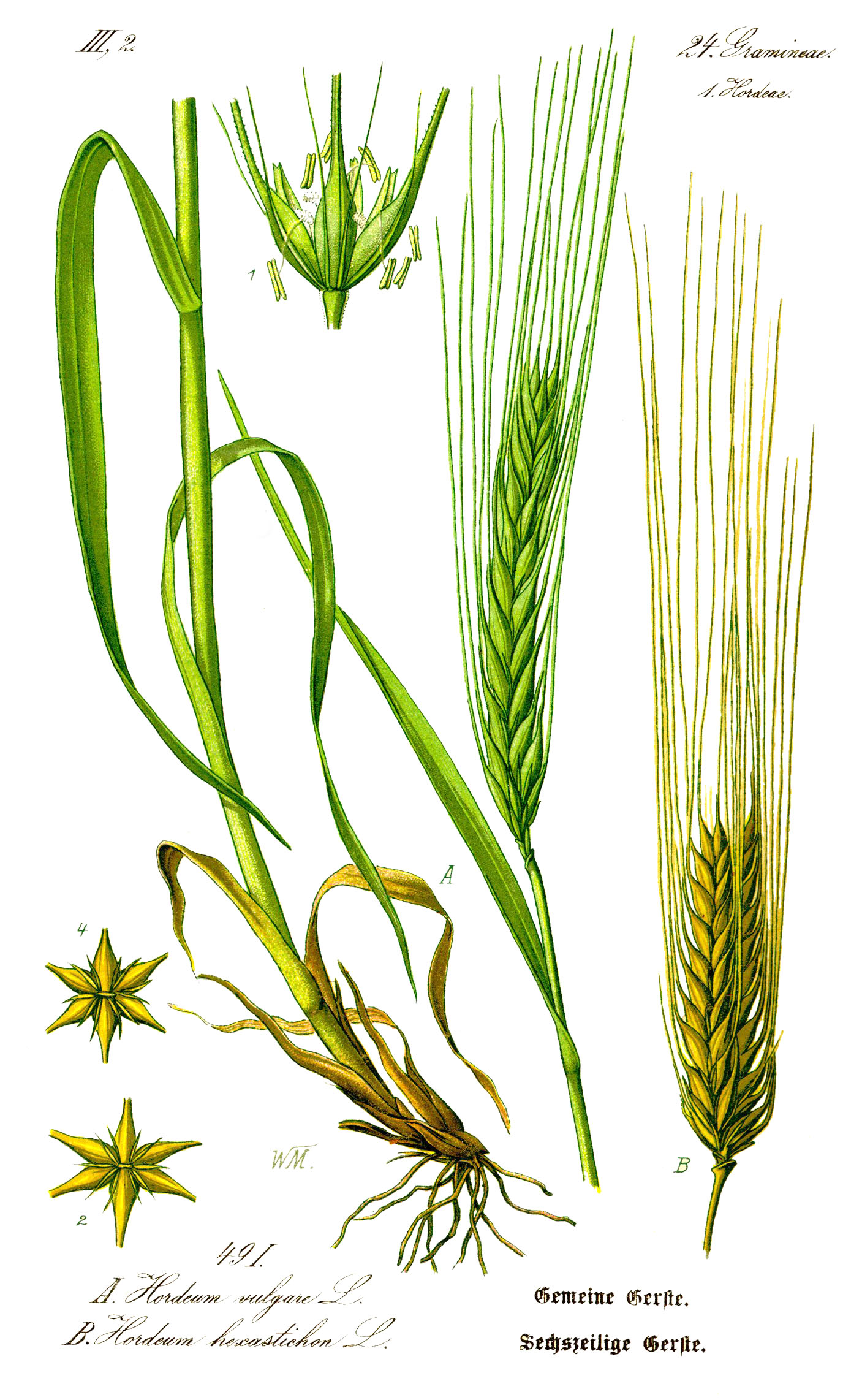
Botanical illustration of leafy stem with roots, flowers, and 2- and 6-row ears

Barley is a cereal, a member of the grass family with edible grains. Its flowers are clusters of spikelets arranged in a distinctive herringbone pattern. Each spikelet has a long thin awn (to 160 mm (6.3 in) long), making the ears look tufted. The spikelets are in clusters of three. In six-row barley, all three spikelets in each cluster are fertile; in two-row barley, only the central one is fertile. It is a self-pollinating, diploid species with 14 chromosomes.

The genome of barley was sequenced in 2012 by the International Barley Genome Sequencing Consortium and the UK Barley Sequencing Consortium. The genome is organised into seven pairs of nuclear chromosomes (recommended designations: 1H, 2H, 3H, 4H, 5H, 6H and 7H), and one mitochondrial and one chloroplast chromosome, with a total of 5000 Mbp. Details of the genome are freely available in several barley databases.

== Origin ==
=== External phylogeny ===
The barley genus Hordeum is relatively closely related to wheat and rye within the Triticeae, and more distantly to rice within the BOP clade of grasses (Poaceae). The phylogeny of the Triticeae is complicated by hybridization between species, so there is a network of relationships rather than a simple inheritance-based tree.

- (Part of Poaceae)
  - BOP clade
    - Bambusoideae (bamboos)
    - - Pooideae
        - other grasses
          (fescue, ryegrass)
        - Triticeae
          - Hordeum (barley)
          - - Triticum (wheat)
            - Secale (rye)
      - Oryza (rice)
  - PACMAD clade
    - other grasses
    - - Sorghum (sorghum)
      - Zea (maize)

=== Domestication ===
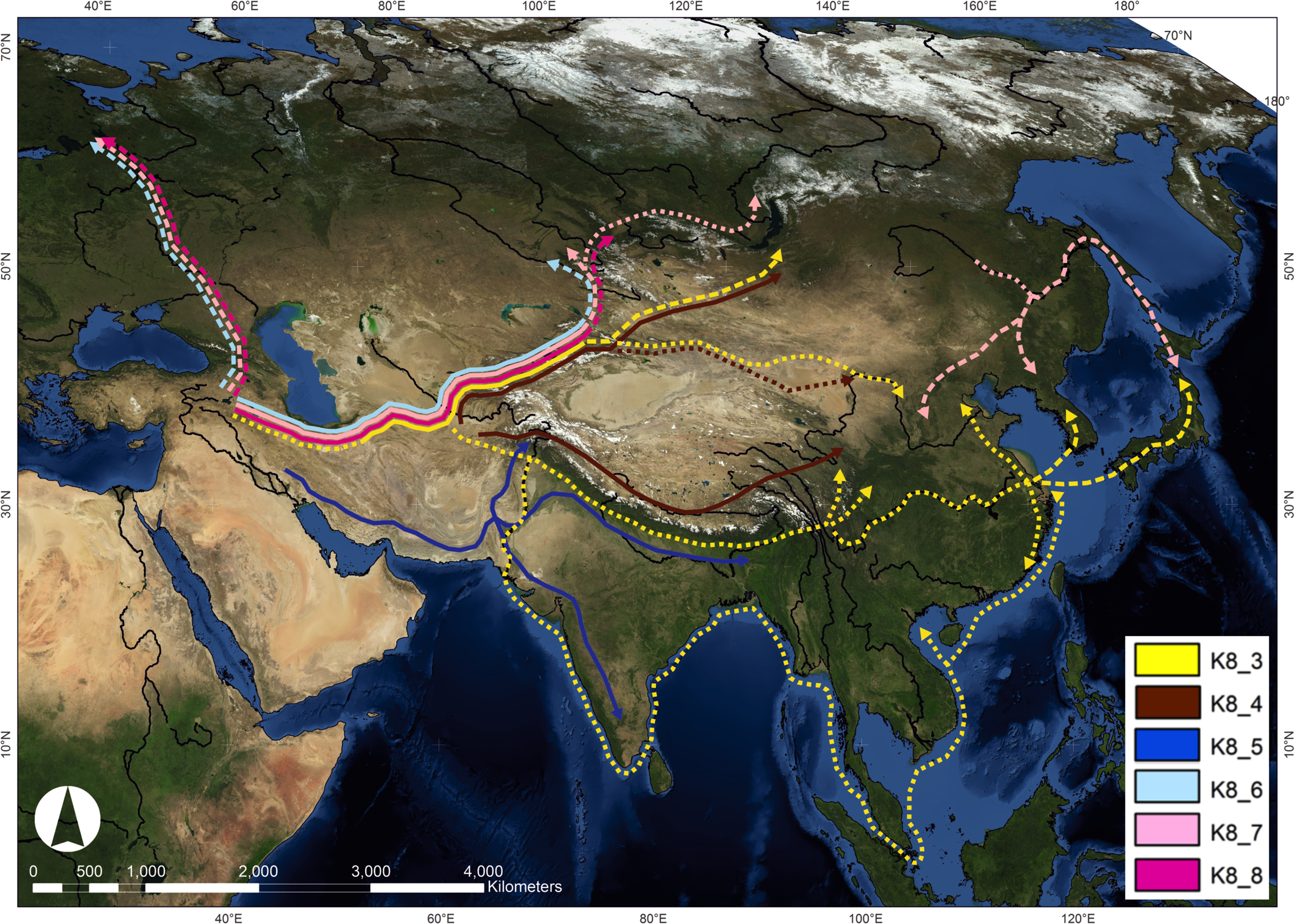
Genetic analysis on the spread of barley from 9,000 to 2,000 BC

Barley was one of the first grains to be domesticated in the Fertile Crescent, an area of relatively abundant water in Western Asia, around 9,000 BC. Wild barley (H. vulgare ssp. spontaneum) ranges from North Africa and Crete in the west to Tibet in the east. A study of genome-wide diversity markers found Tibet to be an additional center of domestication of cultivated barley. The earliest archaeological evidence of the consumption of wild barley, Hordeum spontaneum, comes from the Epipaleolithic at Ohalo II at the southern end of the Sea of Galilee, where grinding stones with traces of starch were found. The remains were dated to about 23,000 BC. The earliest evidence for the domestication of barley, in the form of cultivars that cannot reproduce without human assistance, comes from Mesopotamia, specifically the Jarmo region of modern-day Iraq, around 9,000–7,000 BC.

Domestication changed the morphology of the barley grain substantially, from an elongated shape to a more rounded spherical one. Wild barley has distinctive genes, alleles, and regulators with potential for resistance to abiotic or biotic stresses; these may help cultivated barley to adapt to climatic changes. Wild barley has a brittle spike; upon maturity, the spikelets separate, facilitating seed dispersal. Domesticated barley has nonshattering spikelets, making it much easier to harvest the mature ears. The nonshattering condition is caused by a mutation in one of two tightly linked genes known as Bt_{1} and Bt_{2}; many cultivars possess both mutations. The nonshattering condition is recessive, so varieties of barley that exhibit this condition are homozygous for the mutant allele. Domestication in barley is followed by the change of key phenotypic traits at the genetic level.

The wild barley found currently in the Fertile Crescent may not be the progenitor of the barley cultivated in Eritrea and Ethiopia, indicating that it may have been domesticated separately in eastern Africa.

=== Spread ===
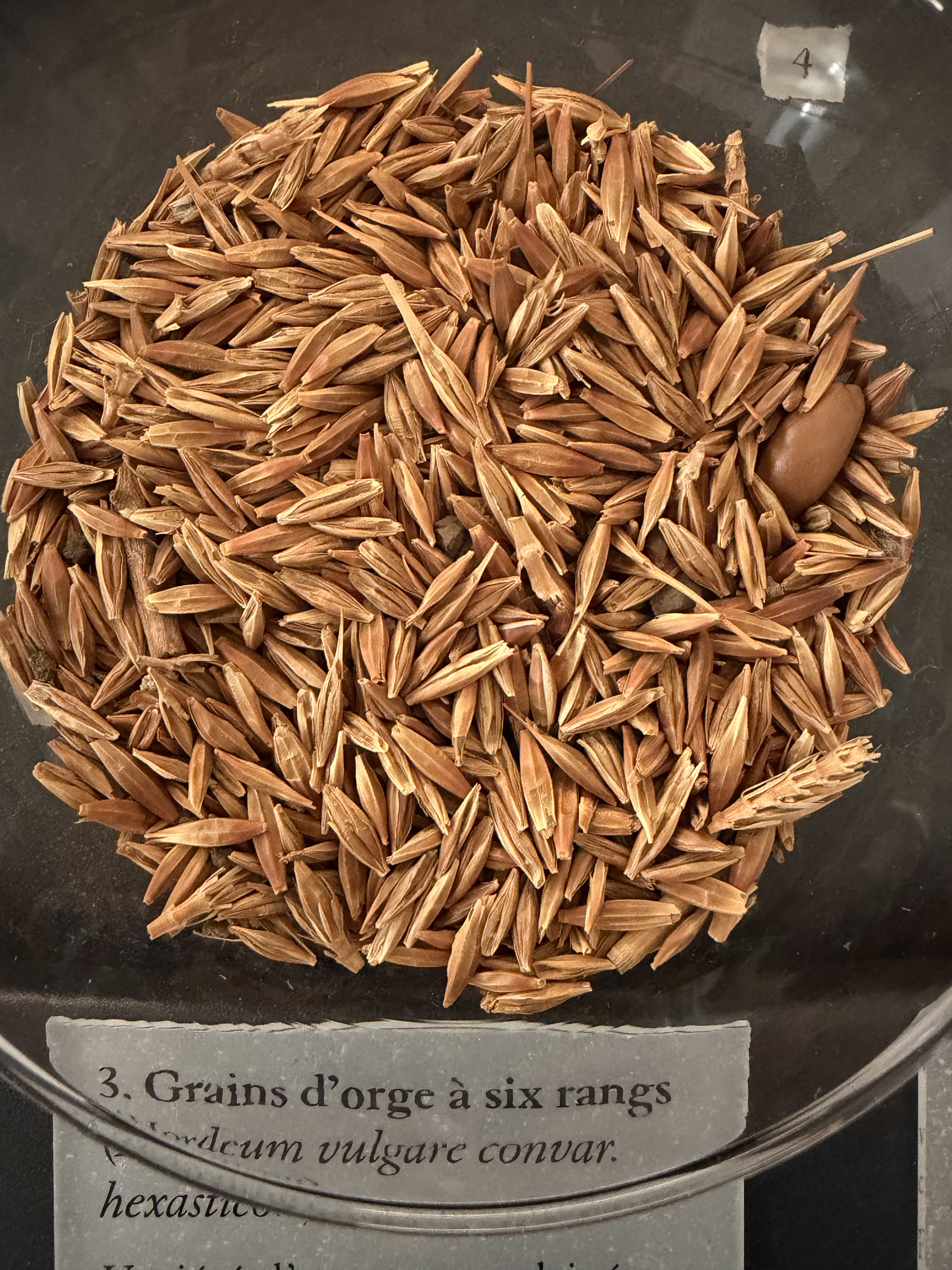
A bowl of ancient six-row barley. Egyptian tomb offering, 2000-1500 BCE. At the Louvre.

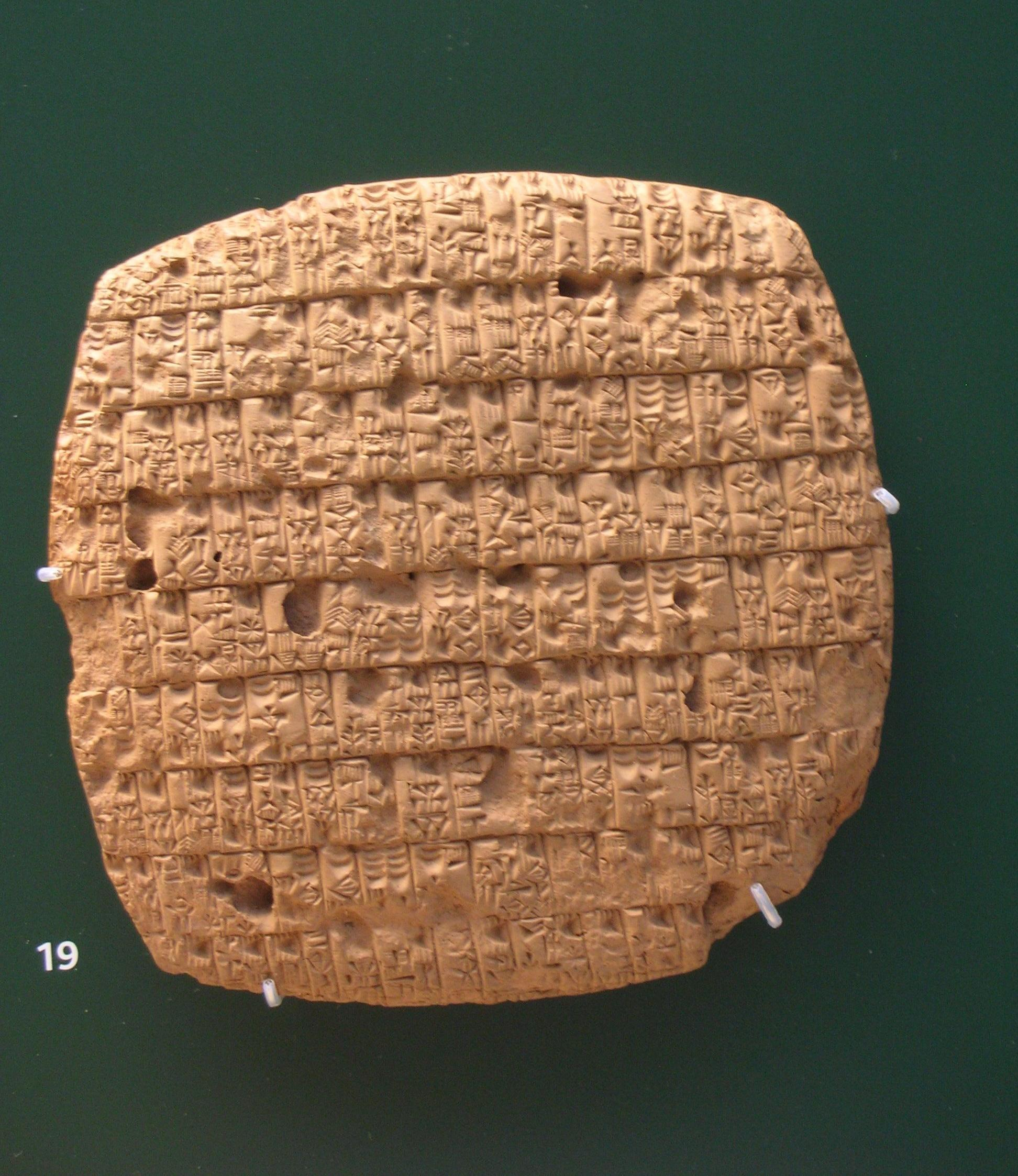
An account of barley rations issued monthly to adults (30 or 40 pints) and children (20 pints) written in cuneiform on clay tablet in year 4 of King Urukagina (circa 2350 BCE), from Girsu, Iraq

Archaeobotanical evidence shows that barley had spread throughout Eurasia by 2,000 BC. Genetic analysis demonstrates that cultivated barley followed several different routes over time. By 4200 BC domesticated barley had reached Eastern Finland. Barley has been grown in the Korean Peninsula since the Early Mumun Pottery Period (circa 1500–850 BC). Barley (Yava in Sanskrit) is mentioned many times in the Rigveda and other Indian scriptures as a principal grain in ancient India. Traces of barley cultivation have been found in post-Neolithic Bronze Age Harappan civilization 5,700–3,300 years ago. Barley beer was probably one of the first alcoholic drinks developed by Neolithic humans; later it was used as currency. The Sumerian language had a word for barley, akiti. In ancient Mesopotamia, a stalk of barley was the primary symbol of the goddess Shala.

Barley in Egyptian hieroglyphs
jt ideogram	M34
jt spelling	i t U9 M33
šma ideogram	U9

Rations of barley for workers appear in Linear B tablets in Mycenaean contexts at Knossos and at Mycenaean Pylos. In mainland Greece, the ritual significance of barley possibly dates back to the earliest stages of the Eleusinian Mysteries. The preparatory kykeon or mixed drink of the initiates, prepared from barley and herbs, mentioned in the Homeric hymn to Demeter. The goddess's name may have meant "barley-mother", incorporating the ancient Cretan word δηαί (dēai), "barley". The practice was to dry the barley groats and roast them before preparing the porridge, according to Pliny the Elder's Natural History. Tibetan barley has been a staple food in Tibetan cuisine since the fifth century AD. This grain, along with a cool climate that permitted storage, produced a civilization that was able to raise great armies. It is made into a flour product called tsampa that is still a staple in Tibet. In medieval Europe, bread made from barley and rye was peasant food, while wheat products were consumed by the upper classes.

== Taxonomy and varieties ==
=== Two-row and six-row barley ===
Spikelets are arranged in triplets which alternate along the rachis. In wild barley (and other Old World species of Hordeum), only the central spikelet is fertile, while the other two are reduced. This condition is retained in certain cultivars known as two-row barleys. A pair of mutations (one dominant, the other recessive) result in fertile lateral spikelets to produce six-row barleys. A mutation in one gene, vrs1, is responsible for the transition from two-row to six-row barley. Brewers in Europe tend to use two-row cultivars and breweries in North America use six-row barley (or a mix), and there are important differences in enzyme content, kernel shape, and other factors that malters and brewers must take into consideration.

In traditional taxonomy, different forms of barley were classified as different species based on morphological differences. Two-row barley with shattering spikes (wild barley) was named Hordeum spontaneum. Two-row barley with nonshattering spikes was named as H. distichon, six-row barley with nonshattering spikes as H. vulgare (or H. hexastichum), and six-row with shattering spikes as H. agriocrithon. Because these differences were driven by single-gene mutations, coupled with cytological and molecular evidence, most recent classifications treat these forms as a single species, H. vulgare.

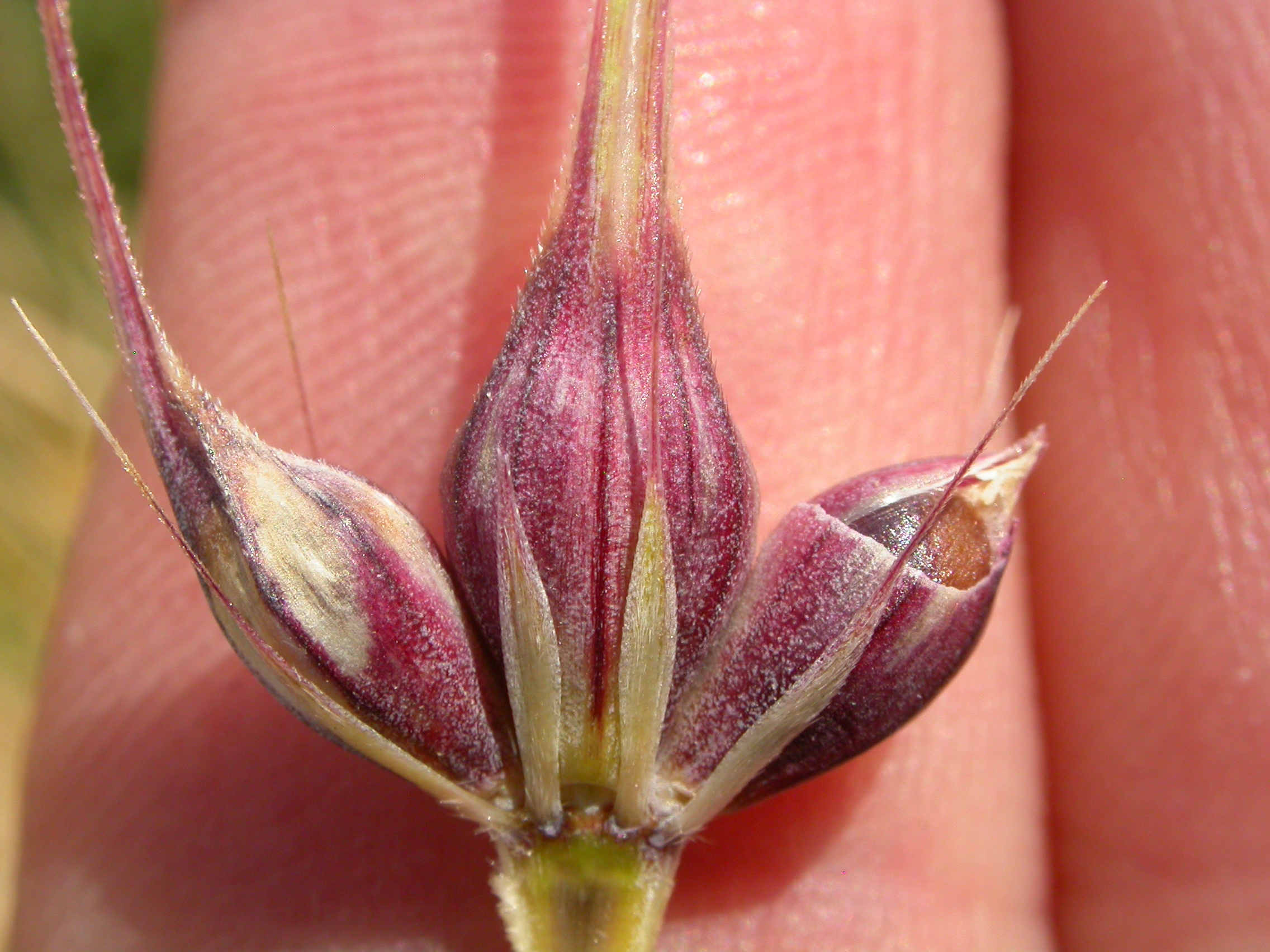
6-row barley has three fertile spikelets per cluster

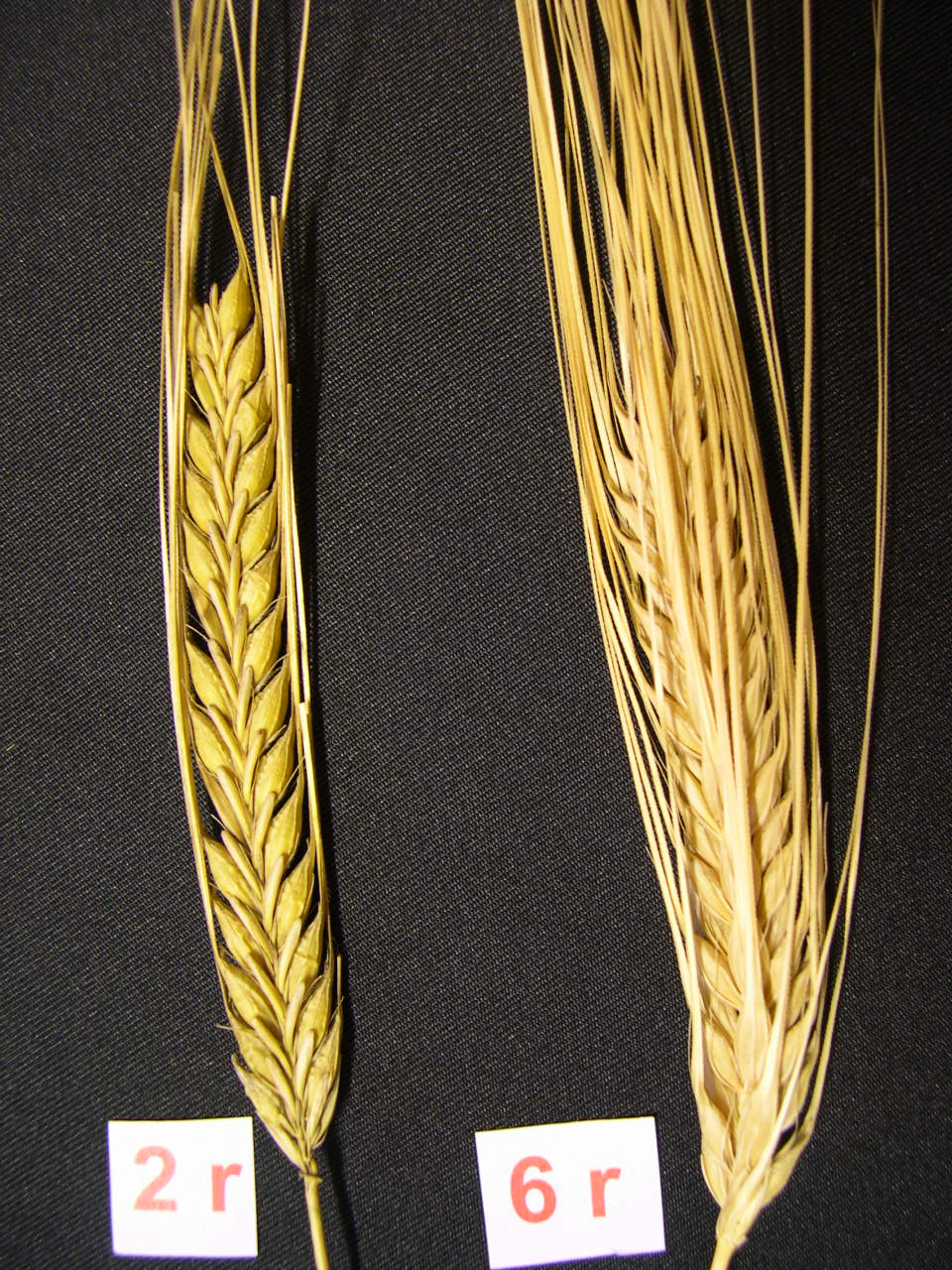
Two-row and six-row

=== Hulless barley ===
Hulless or "naked" barley (Hordeum vulgare var. nudum) is a form of domesticated barley with an easier-to-remove hull. Naked barley is an ancient food crop, but a new industry has developed around uses of selected hulless barley to increase the digestibility of the grain, especially for pigs and poultry. Hulless barley has been investigated for several potential new applications as whole grain, bran, and flour. Hulless barley can offer higher protein, increased beta-glucan content, and more efficient handling and processing because of the lack of hull.

== Production ==
Barley production 2024, millions of tonnes
Russia	16.7
Australia	13.3
Germany	10.6
France	9.7
Turkey	8.1
Canada	8.1
World	142.0
Source: FAOSTAT of the United Nations

In 2024, world production of barley was 142 million tonnes, led by Russia with 12% of the total (table). Australia, Germany, and France were secondary producers.

Worldwide barley production in 2023 was fourth among grains, following maize (1.2 billion tonnes), rice (800 million tonnes), and wheat (799 million tonnes).

Barley production

Barley yields

== Cultivation ==
Barley is a crop that prefers relatively low temperatures, 15 to 20 °C (59 to 68 °F) in the growing season; it is grown around the world in temperate areas. It grows best in well-drained soil in full sunshine. In the tropics and subtropics, it is grown for food and straw in South Asia, North and East Africa, and in the Andes of South America. In dry regions it requires irrigation. It has a short growing season and is relatively drought-tolerant. Barley is more tolerant of soil salinity than other cereals, varying in different cultivars. It has less winter-hardiness than winter wheat and far less than rye.

Like other cereals, barley is typically planted on tilled land. Seed was traditionally scattered, but in developed countries is usually drilled. As it grows it requires soil nutrients (nitrogen, phosphorus, potassium), often supplied as fertilizers. It needs to be monitored for pests and diseases, and if necessary treated before these become serious. The stems and ears turn yellow when ripe, and the ears begin to droop. Traditional harvesting was by hand with sickles or scythes; in developed countries, harvesting is mechanised with combine harvesters.

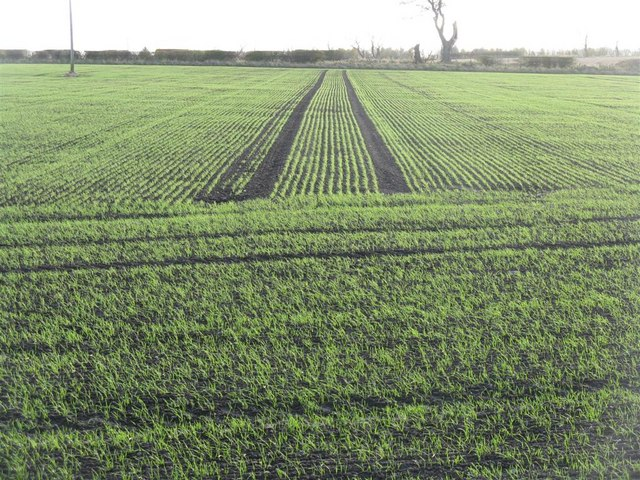
Young winter barley in early November,
Scotland, 2009

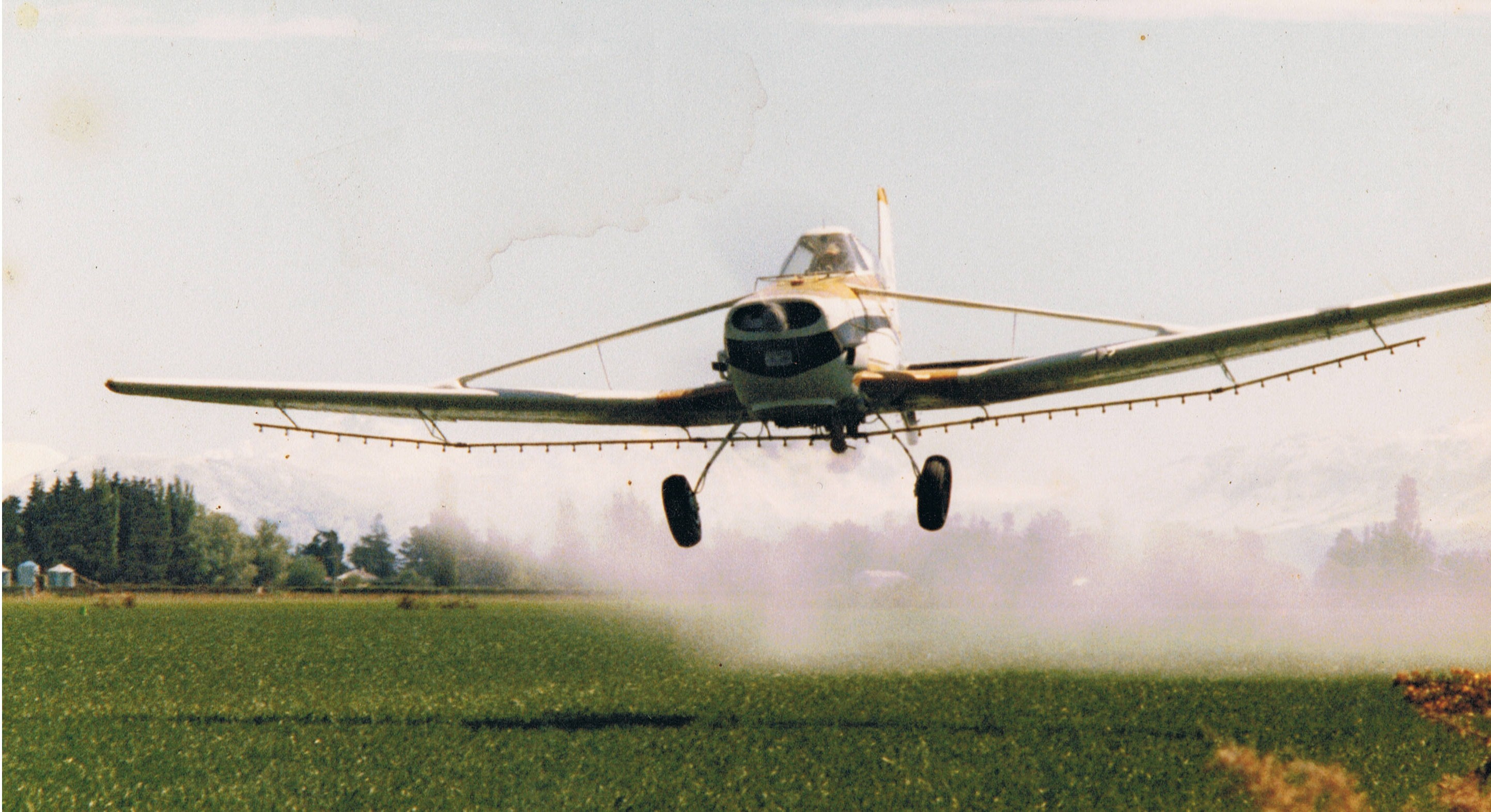
Spraying barley for rust fungus,
New Zealand, 1979

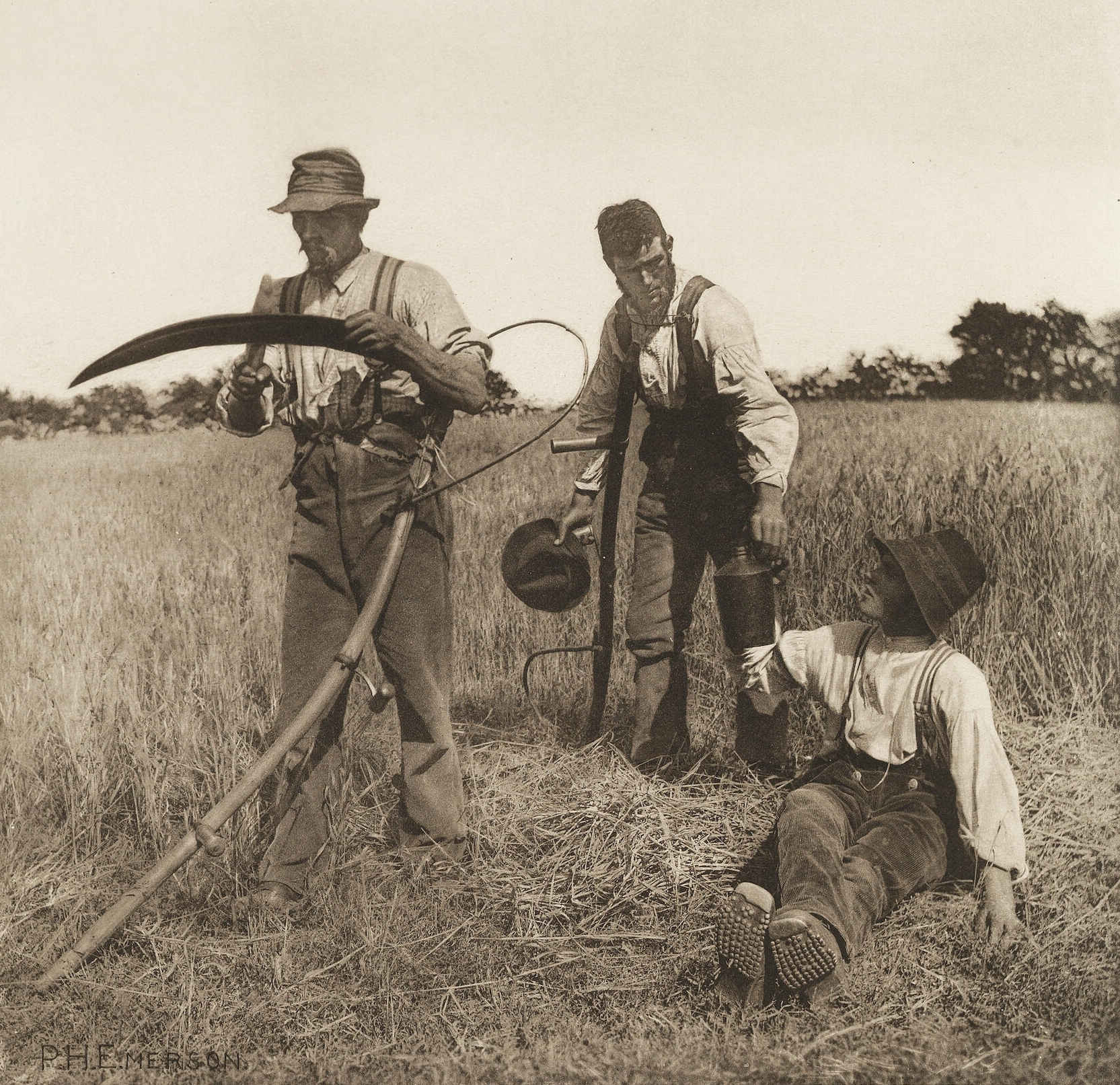
Traditional barley harvest by hand with scythes, England, c. 1886.
Photo Peter Henry Emerson

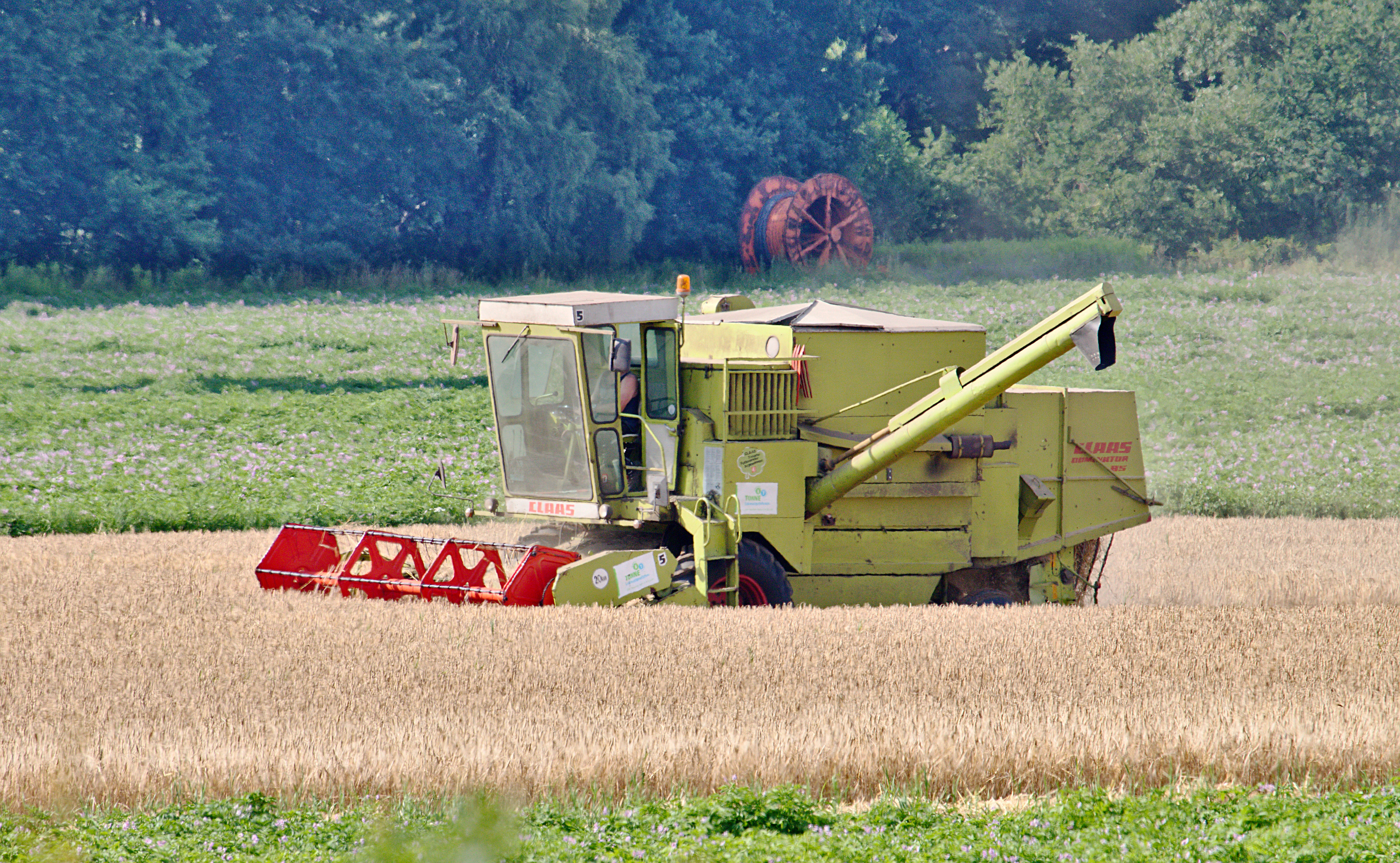
Harvesting winter barley with a combine harvester, Germany, 2017

== Pests and diseases ==
Among the insect pests of barley are aphids such as Russian wheat aphid, caterpillars such as of the armyworm moth, barley mealybug, and wireworm larvae of click beetle genera such as Aeolus. Aphid damage can often be tolerated, whereas armyworms can eat whole leaves. Wireworms kill seedlings, and require seed or preplanting treatment.

Serious fungal diseases of barley include powdery mildew caused by Blumeria hordei, leaf scald caused by Rhynchosporium secalis, barley rust caused by Puccinia hordei, crown rust caused by Puccinia coronata, various diseases caused by Cochliobolus sativus, Fusarium ear blight, and stem rust (Puccinia graminis). Bacterial diseases of barley include bacterial blight caused by Xanthomonas campestris pv. translucens. Barley is susceptible to several viral diseases, such as barley mild mosaic bymovirus. Some viruses, such as barley yellow dwarf virus, vectored by the rice root aphid, can cause serious crop injury.

For durable disease resistance, quantitative resistance is more important than qualitative resistance. The most important foliar diseases have corresponding resistance gene regions on all chromosomes of barley. A large number of molecular markers are available for breeding of resistance to leaf rust, powdery mildew, Rhynchosporium secalis, Pyrenophora teres f. teres, Barley yellow dwarf virus, and the Barley yellow mosaic virus complex.

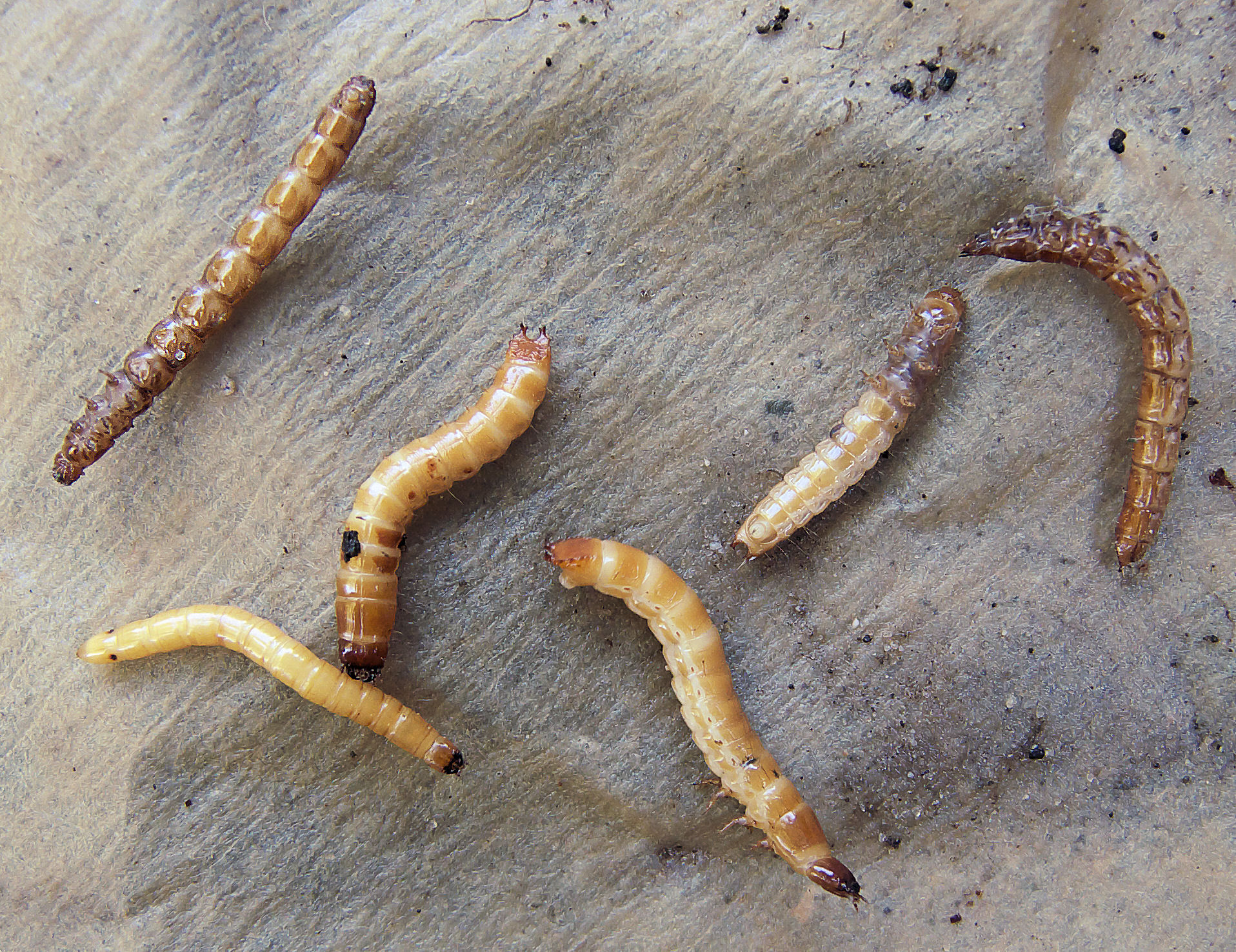
Wireworms, the larvae of click beetles, kill barley seedlings.

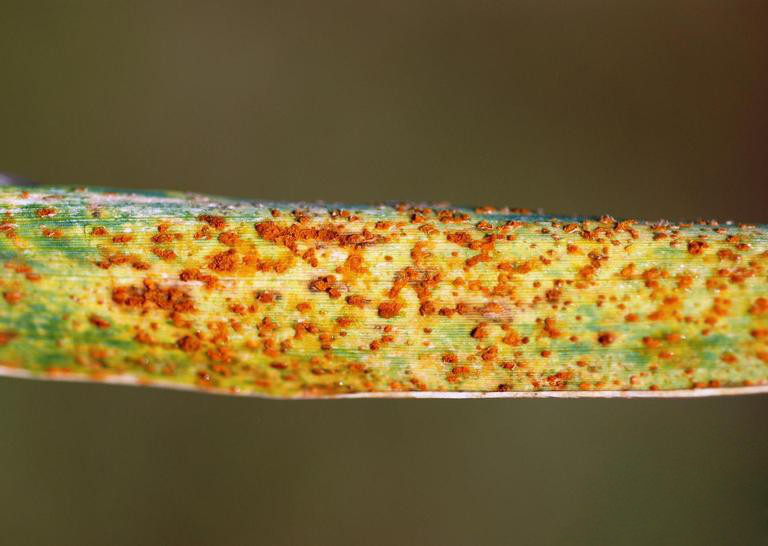
Barley rust, a disease caused by the fungus Puccinia hordei

== Food ==
Cooked pearled barley
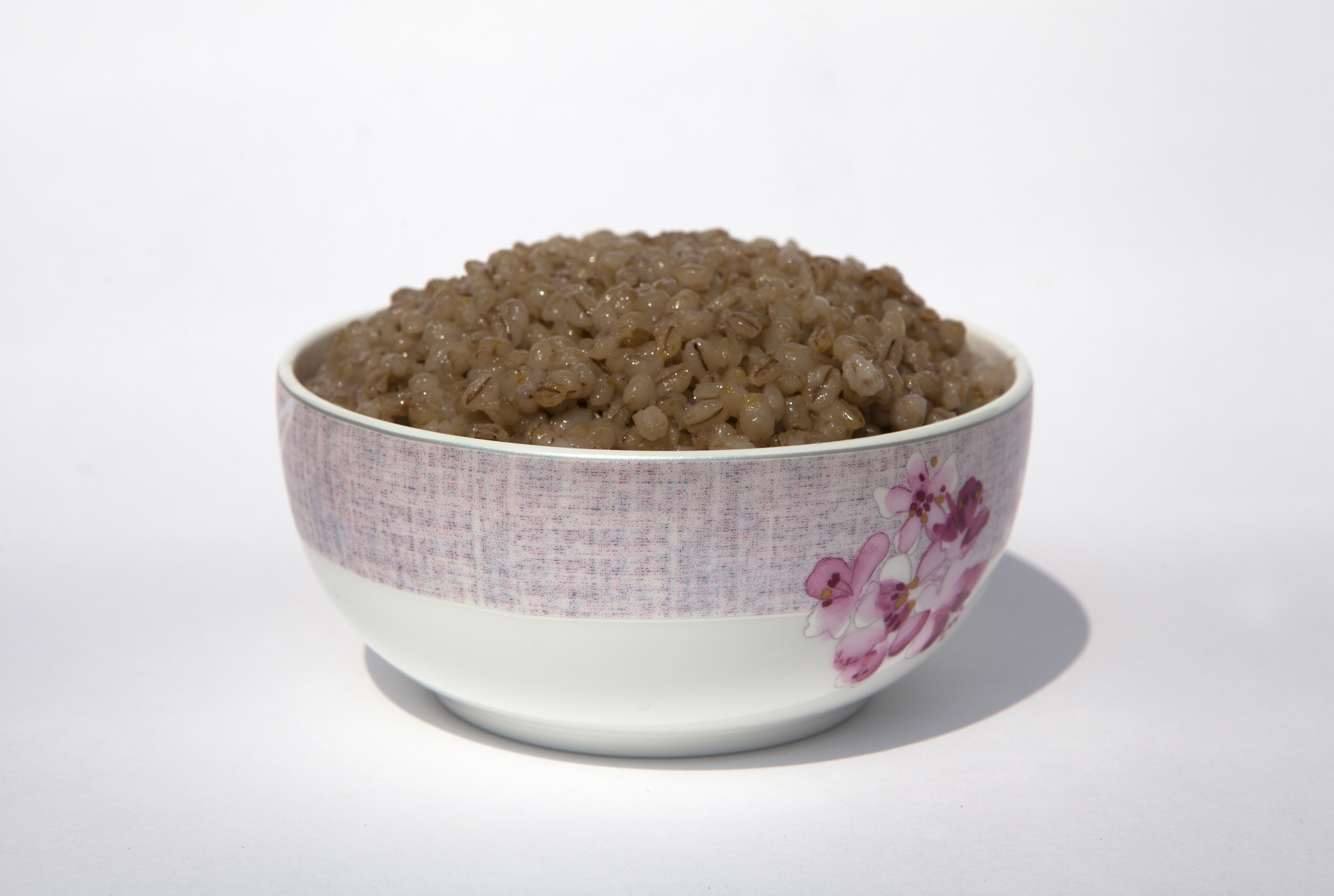

Nutritional value per 100 g (3.5 oz)
- Energy: 515 kJ (123 kcal)
- Carbohydrates: 28.2 g
- Sugars: 0.3 g
- Dietary fiber: 3.8 g
- Fat: 0.4 g
- Protein: 2.3 g
Vitamins and minerals
Vitamins	Quantity %DV^{†}
Vitamin A equiv. beta-Carotene lutein zeaxanthin	0% 0 μg 0% 5 μg 56 μg
Thiamine (B1)	7% 0.083 mg
Riboflavin (B2)	5% 0.062 mg
Niacin (B3)	13% 2.063 mg
Pantothenic acid (B5)	3% 0.135 mg
Vitamin B6	7% 0.115 mg
Folate (B9)	4% 16 μg
Vitamin B12	0% 0 μg
Choline	2% 13.4 mg
Vitamin C	0% 0 mg
Vitamin D	0% 0 IU
Vitamin E	0% 0.01 mg
Vitamin K	1% 0.8 μg
Minerals	Quantity %DV^{†}
Calcium	1% 11 mg
Copper	12% 0.105 mg
Iron	7% 1.3 mg
Magnesium	5% 22 mg
Manganese	11% 0.259 mg
Phosphorus	4% 54 mg
Potassium	3% 93 mg
Sodium	0% 3 mg
Zinc	7% 0.82 mg
- Other constituents: Quantity
- Water: 68.8 g
- Cholesterol: 0 mg
- Link to USDA Database entry
- ^{†}Percentages estimated using US recommendations for adults, except for potassium, which is estimated based on expert recommendation from the National Academies.

=== Preparation ===
Hulled barley (or covered barley) is eaten after removing the inedible, fibrous, outer husk or hull. Once removed, it is called dehulled barley (or pot barley or scotch barley). Pearl barley (or pearled barley) is dehulled to remove most of the bran, and polished. Barley meal, a wholemeal barley flour lighter than wheat meal but darker in colour, is used in gruel. This gruel is known as سويق : sawīq in the Arab world.

With a long history of cultivation in the Middle East, barley is used in a wide range of traditional Arabic, Assyrian, Israelite, Kurdish, and Persian foodstuffs including keşkek, kashk, and murri. Barley soup is traditionally eaten during Ramadan in Saudi Arabia. Cholent or hamin (in Hebrew) is a traditional Jewish stew often eaten on the Sabbath, in numerous recipes by both Mizrahi and Ashkenazi Jews; its original form was a barley porridge.

In Eastern and Central Europe, barley is used in soups and stews such as ričet. In Africa, where it is a traditional food plant, it has the potential to improve nutrition, boost food security, foster rural development, and support sustainable landcare.

The six-row variety bere is cultivated in Orkney, Shetland, Caithness and the Western Isles of the Scottish Highlands and Islands. When milled into beremeal, it is used locally in bread, biscuits, and the traditional beremeal bannock.

In Japanese cuisine, barley is mixed with rice and steamed as mugimeshi. The naval surgeon Takaki Kanehiro introduced it into institutional cooking to combat beriberi, endemic in the armed forces in the 19th century. It became standard prison fare, and remains a staple in the Japan Self-Defense Forces.

In Korean cuisine, a similar dish called boribap (보리밥) has been eaten since the Joseon dynasty. In Jeju Island, unripe barley rice was eaten in spring when food was short. Barley rice, hard to cook and linked to poverty, had lower status than white rice. In the 1960s and 1970s, schoolchildren's lunchboxes had to contain barley rice. Barley rice has become a nostalgic food for older people, served in specialty restaurants.

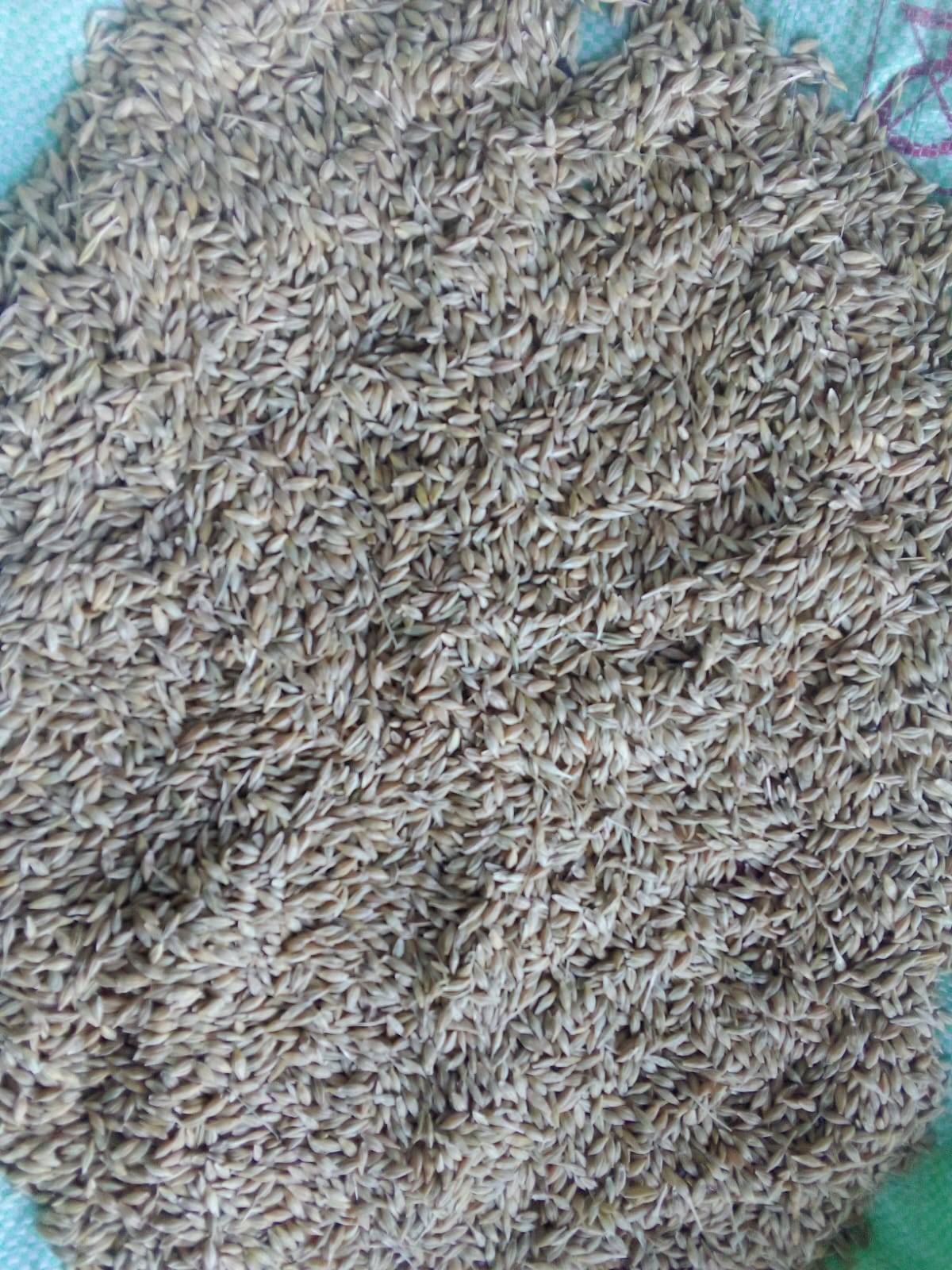
Air-dried barley

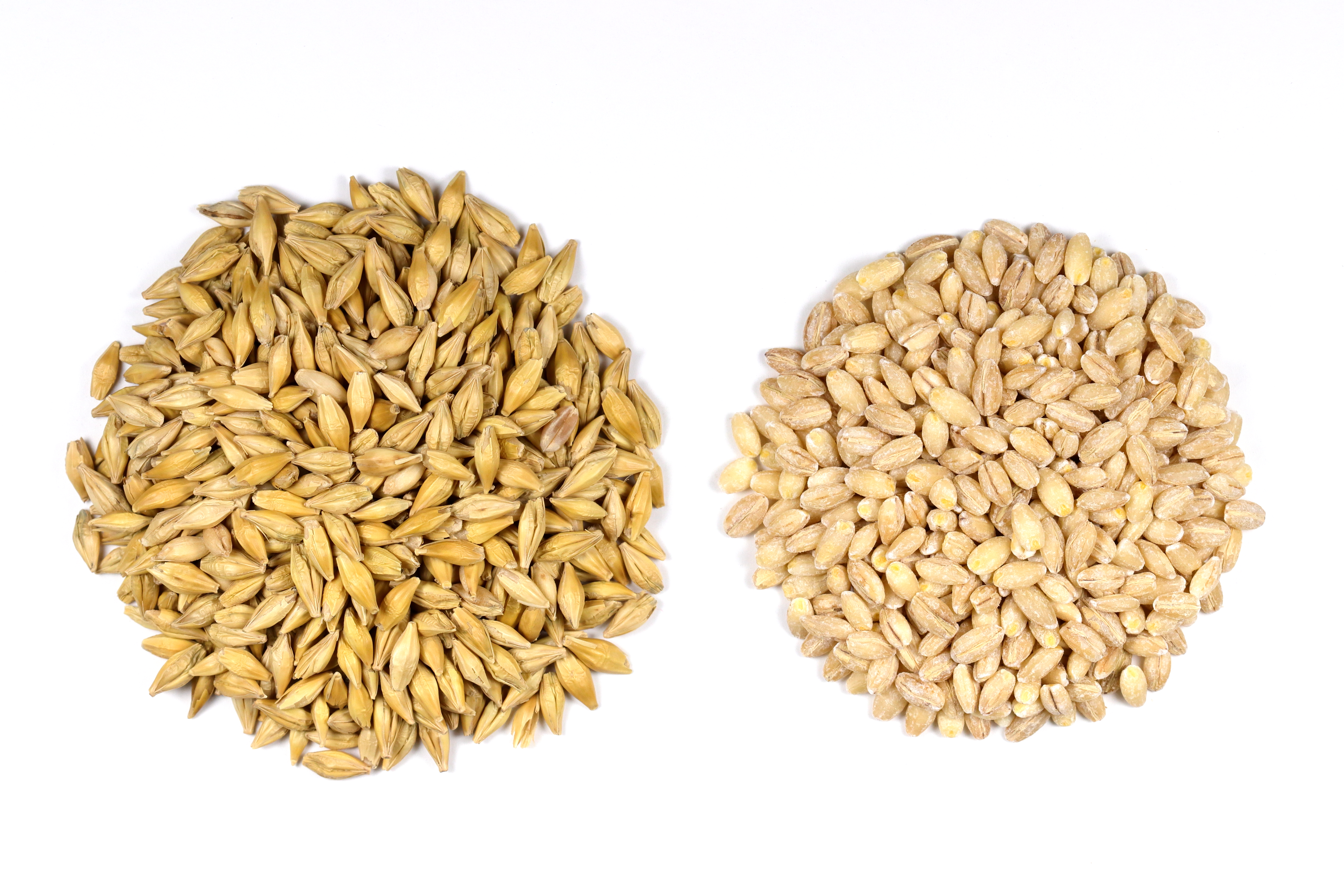
Barley grains with and without the outer husk

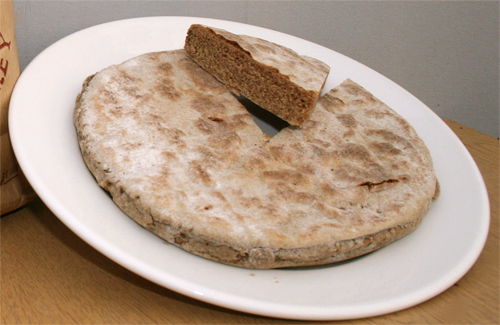
Beremeal bannock, Orkney, 2008

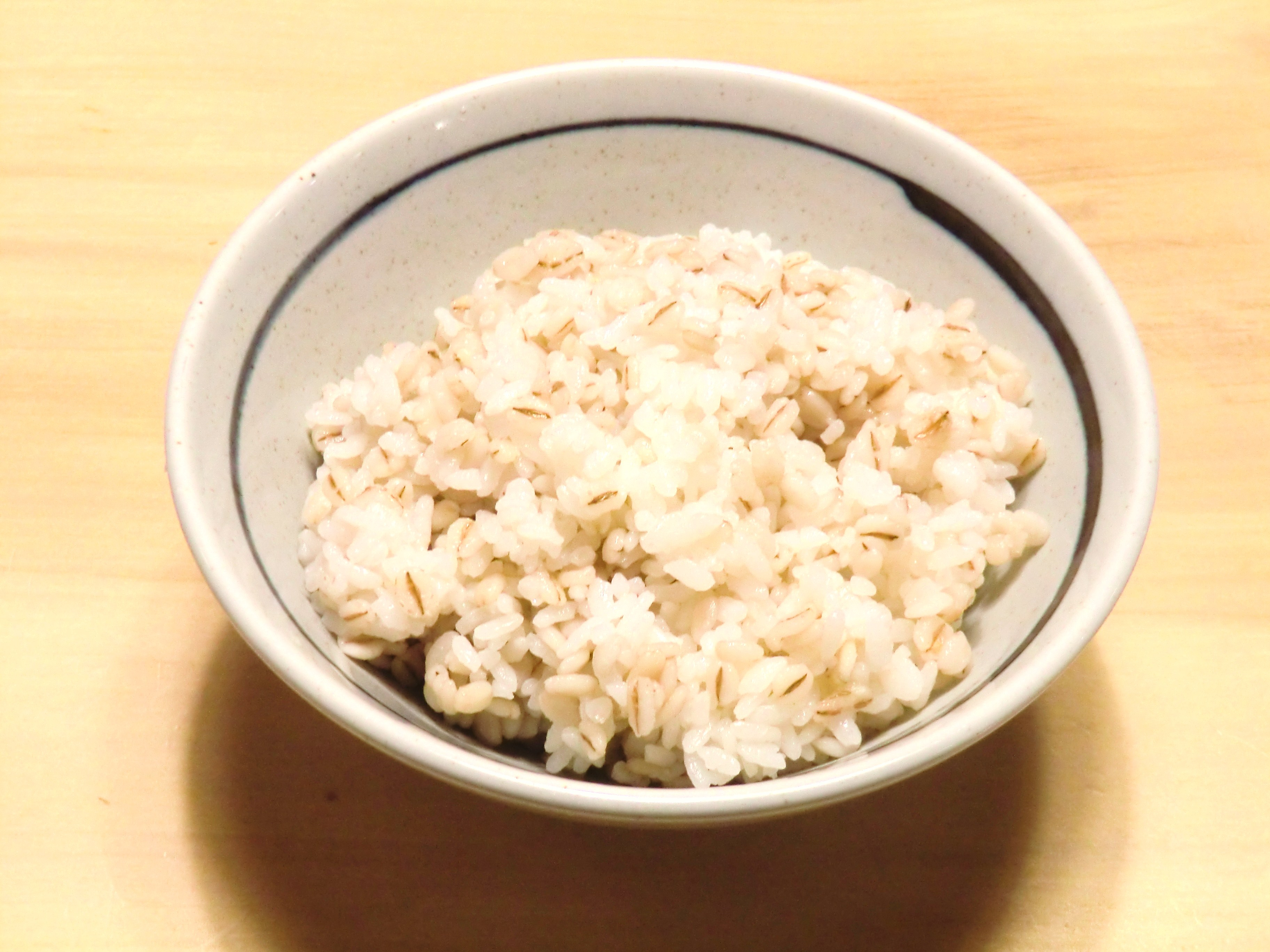
Mugimeshi, Japanese steamed barley rice

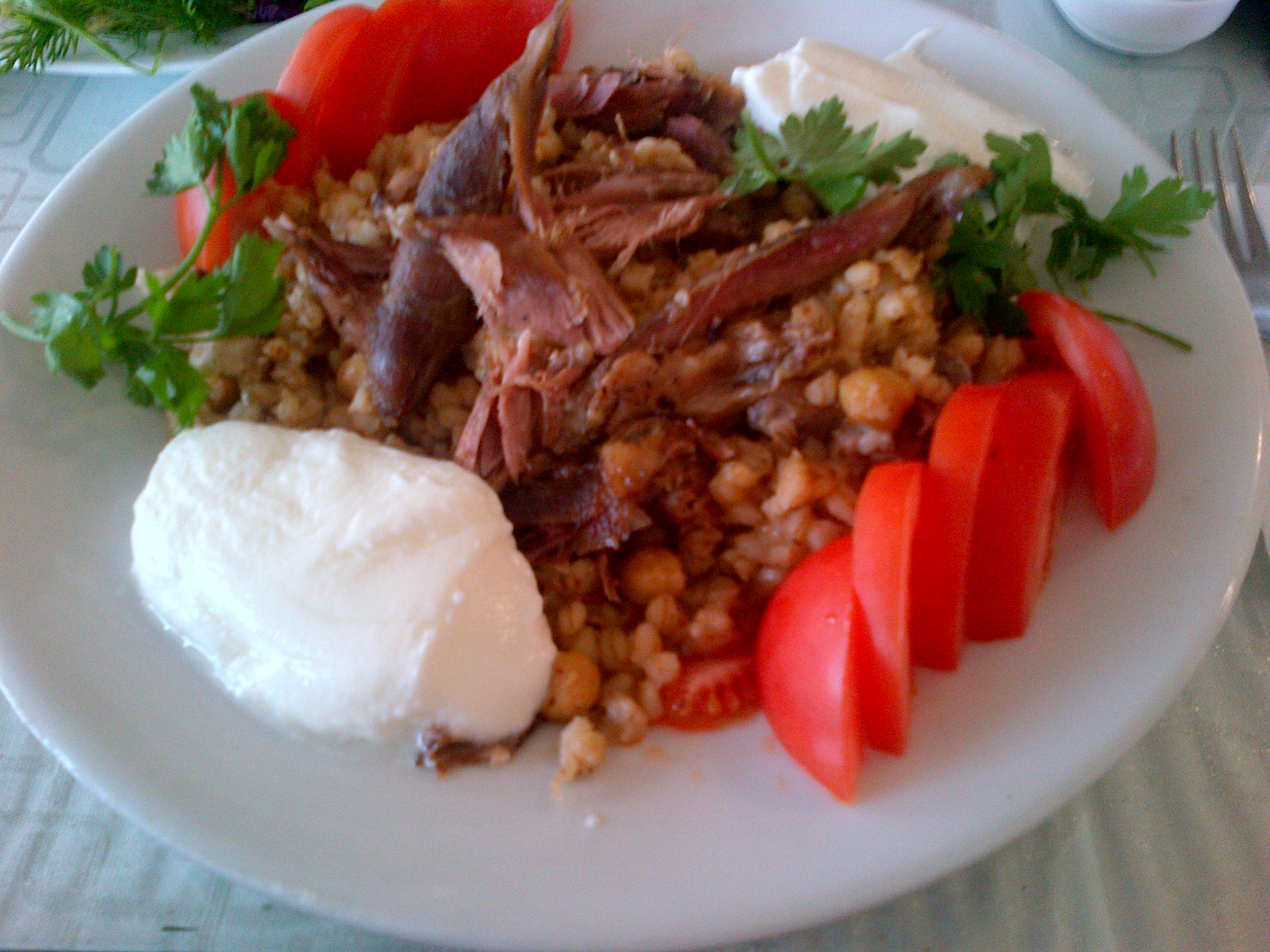
Keşkek, a Middle Eastern barley stew

=== Nutrition ===
Cooked barley is 69% water, 28% carbohydrates, 2% protein, and 0.4% fat (table). In a 100-gram (3.5 oz) reference serving, cooked barley provides 515 kilojoules (123 kcal) of food energy and is a good source (10% or more of the Daily Value, DV) of essential nutrients, including, dietary fibre, the B vitamin niacin (14% DV), and dietary minerals, including iron (10% DV) and manganese (12% DV) (table).

=== Health implications ===
According to Health Canada and the US Food and Drug Administration, consuming at least 3 grams per day of barley beta-glucan can lower levels of blood cholesterol, a risk factor for cardiovascular diseases. Eating whole-grain barley, a high-fibre grain, improves regulation of blood sugar (i.e., reduces blood glucose response to a meal). Consuming breakfast cereals containing barley over weeks to months improves cholesterol levels and glucose regulation. Barley contains gluten, which makes it an unsuitable grain for consumption by people with gluten-related disorders, such as coeliac disease, non-coeliac gluten sensitivity and wheat allergy sufferers. Nevertheless, some wheat allergy patients can tolerate barley.

== Uses ==
=== Beer, whisky, and soft drinks ===
Barley, made into malt, is a key ingredient in beer and whisky production. Two-row barley is traditionally used in German and English beers. Six-row barley was traditionally used in US beers, but both varieties are in common usage now. Distilled from green beer, Scottish and Irish whisky are made primarily from barley. About 25% of American barley is used for malting, for which barley is the best-suited grain. Accordingly, barley is often assessed by its malting enzyme content. Barley wine is a style of strong beer from the English brewing tradition. An 18th-century alcoholic drink of the same name was made by boiling barley in water, then mixing the barley water with white wine, borage, lemon and sugar. In the 19th century, a different barley wine was prepared from recipes of ancient Greek origin.

Nonalcoholic drinks such as barley water and roasted barley tea have been made by boiling barley in water. In Italy, roasted barley is sometimes used as coffee substitute, caffè d'orzo (barley coffee).

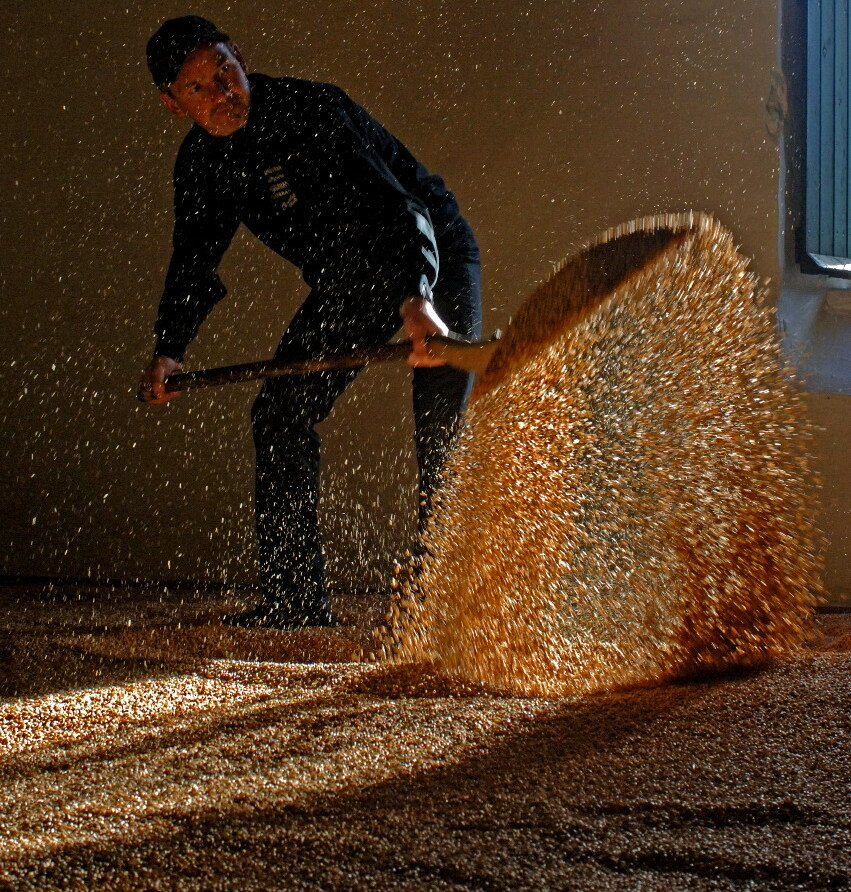
Traditional floor malting in Scotland for malt whisky

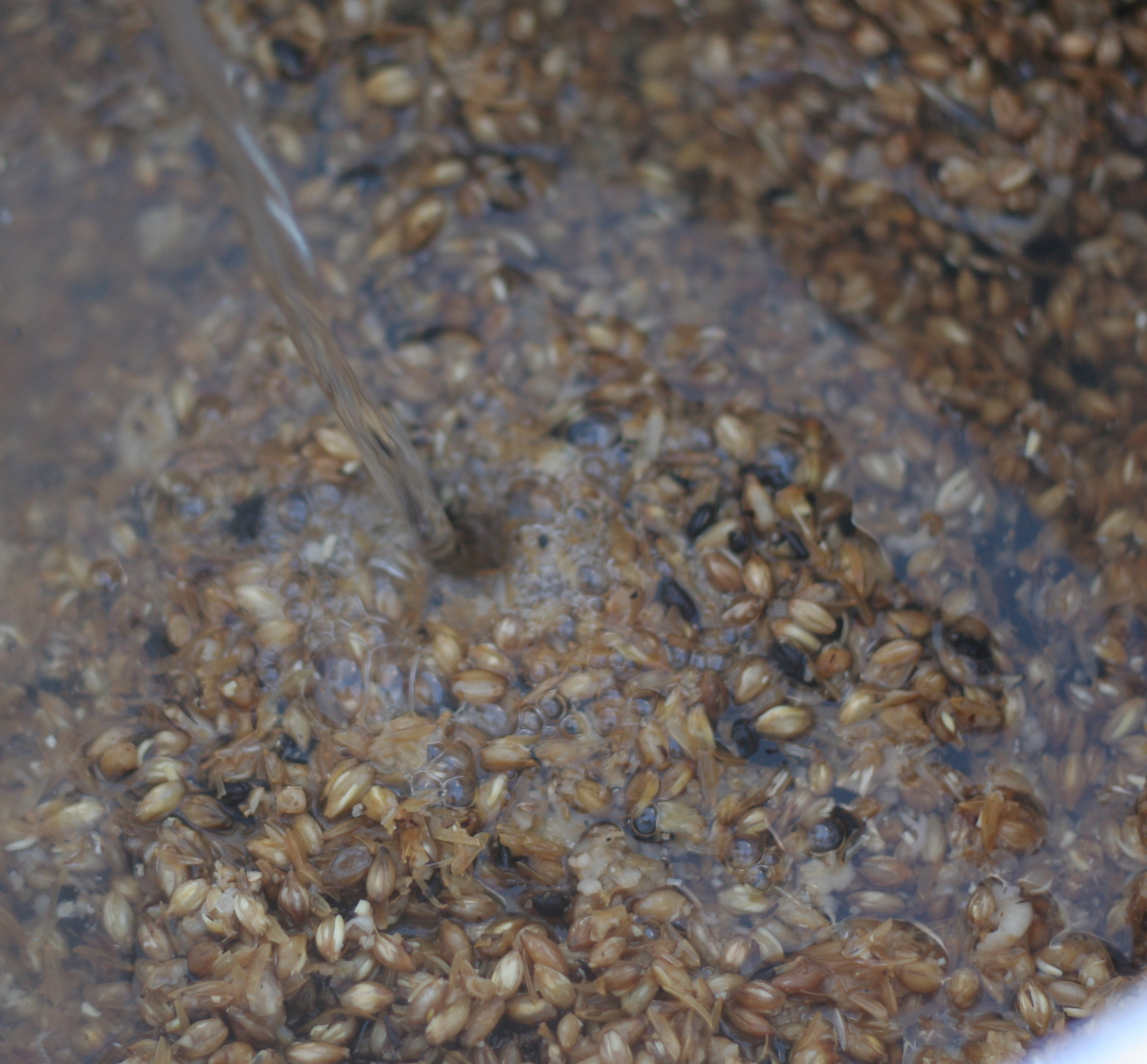
Barley grains being mashed (heated with water) for brewing beer

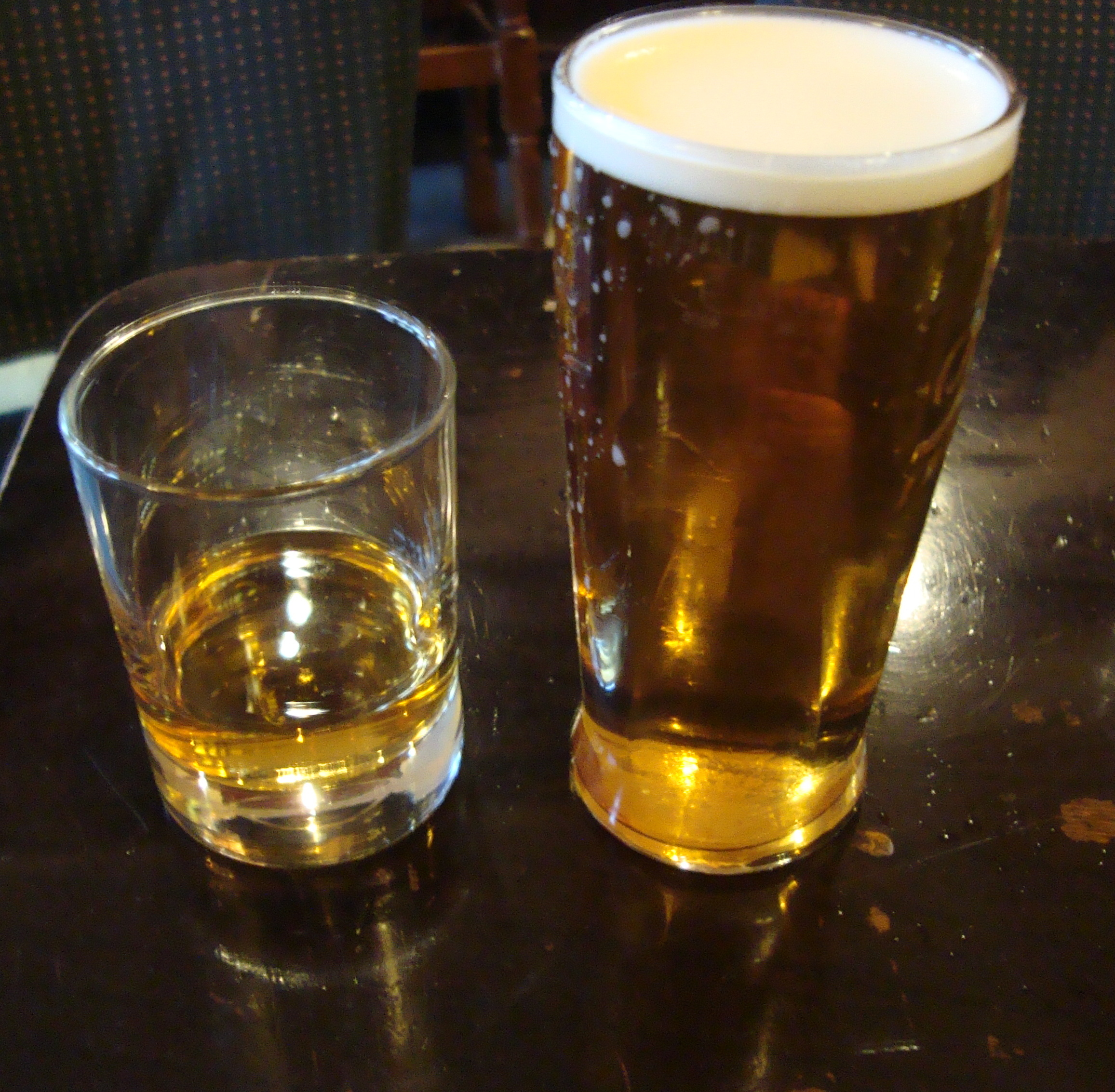
Scotch whisky and beer,
both made from barley

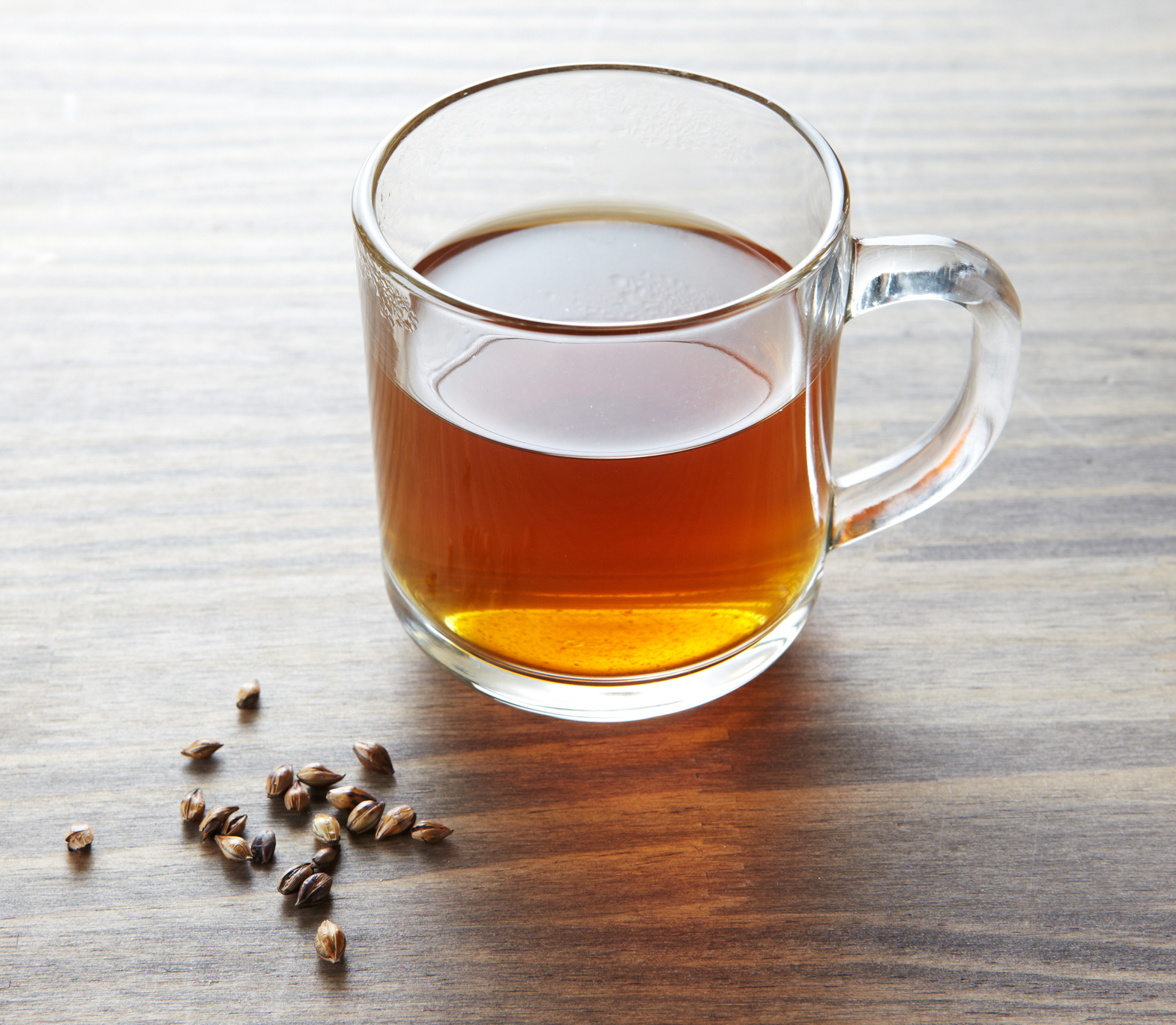
Boricha, Korean
roasted barley tea

=== Animal feed ===
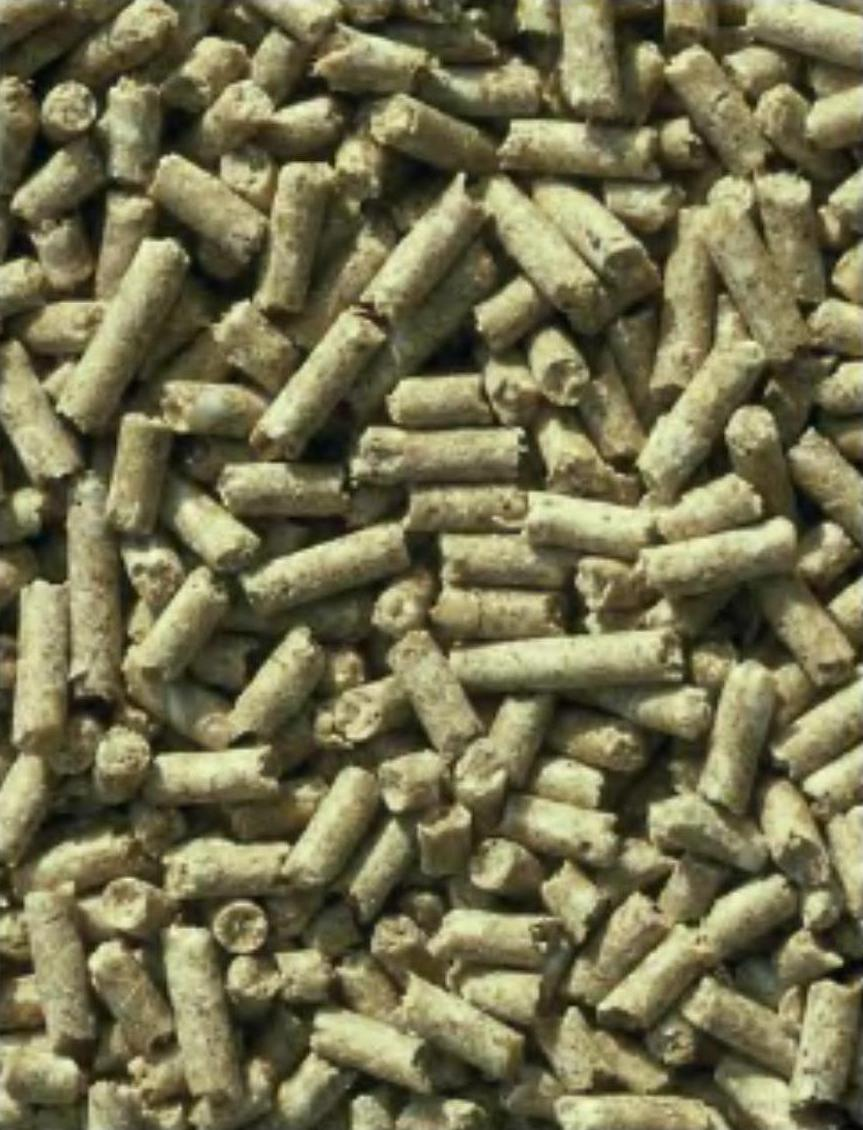
Barley-based animal feed pellets

Some 70% of the world's barley production is used as livestock feed, for example for cattle feeding in western Canada. In 2014, an enzymatic process was devised to make a high-protein fish feed from barley, suitable for carnivorous fish such as trout and salmon.

=== Cover crops ===
When sown in the autumn and terminated and tilled into the soil in spring, barley cover crops significantly reduced early-season weed density and time required for hand-hoeing in southern New Mexico chile pepper systems. The weed-suppressive effect of barley was demonstrated in a subsequent ex situ study, in which Palmer amaranth seeds demonstrated slowed germination when incubated with barley-amended soil compared to unamended soil. The inability of barley to support oviposition of the beet leafhopper, an insect known to vector Beet Curly Top Virus to more than 300 species of plants, further poses it as a potential method of integrated pest management in chile pepper.

=== Other uses ===
Barley straw has been placed in mesh bags and floated in fish ponds or water gardens to help prevent algal growth without harming pond plants and animals. The technique's effectiveness is at best mixed. Barley grains were once used for measurement in England, there being nominally three or four barleycorns to the inch. By the 19th century, this had been superseded by standard inch measures. In ancient Mesopotamia, barley was used as a form of money, the standard unit of weight for barley, and hence of value, being the shekel. Barley water was used in medieval times as a remedy, as mentioned by Avicenna.

== Culture and folklore ==
In the Old English poem Beowulf, and in Norse mythology, Scyld Scefing (the second name meaning "with a sheaf") and his son Beow ("Barley") are associated with the grain, or are possibly corn-gods; J. R. R. Tolkien wrote a poem "King Sheave" about them, and based a major element of his legendarium, the Old Straight Road from Middle-earth to the earthly paradise of Valinor, on their story. William of Malmesbury's 12th century Chronicle tells the story of the related figure Sceafa as a sleeping child in a boat without oars with a sheaf of corn at his head. Axel Olrik identified Peko, a parallel "barley-figure" in Finnish culture, in turn connected by R.D. Fulk with the Eddaic Bergelmir.

In English folklore, the figure of John Barleycorn in the folksong of the same name is a personification of barley, and of the beer made from it. In the song, John Barleycorn is represented as suffering attacks, death, and indignities that correspond to the various stages of barley cultivation, such as reaping and malting; but he is revenged by getting the men drunk: "And little Sir John and the nut-brown bowl / Proved the strongest man at last." The folksong "Elsie Marley" celebrates an alewife of County Durham with lines such as "And do you ken Elsie Marley, honey? / The wife that sells the barley, honey". The antiquary Cuthbert Sharp records that Elsie Marley was "a handsome, buxom, bustling landlady, and brought good custom to the [ale] house by her civility and attention."

English pub names such as The Barley Mow, John Barleycorn, Malt Shovel, and Mash Tun allude to barley's role in the production of beer.

The Sting song "Fields of Gold" was inspired by the barley fields around his Wiltshire manor house, Lake House.

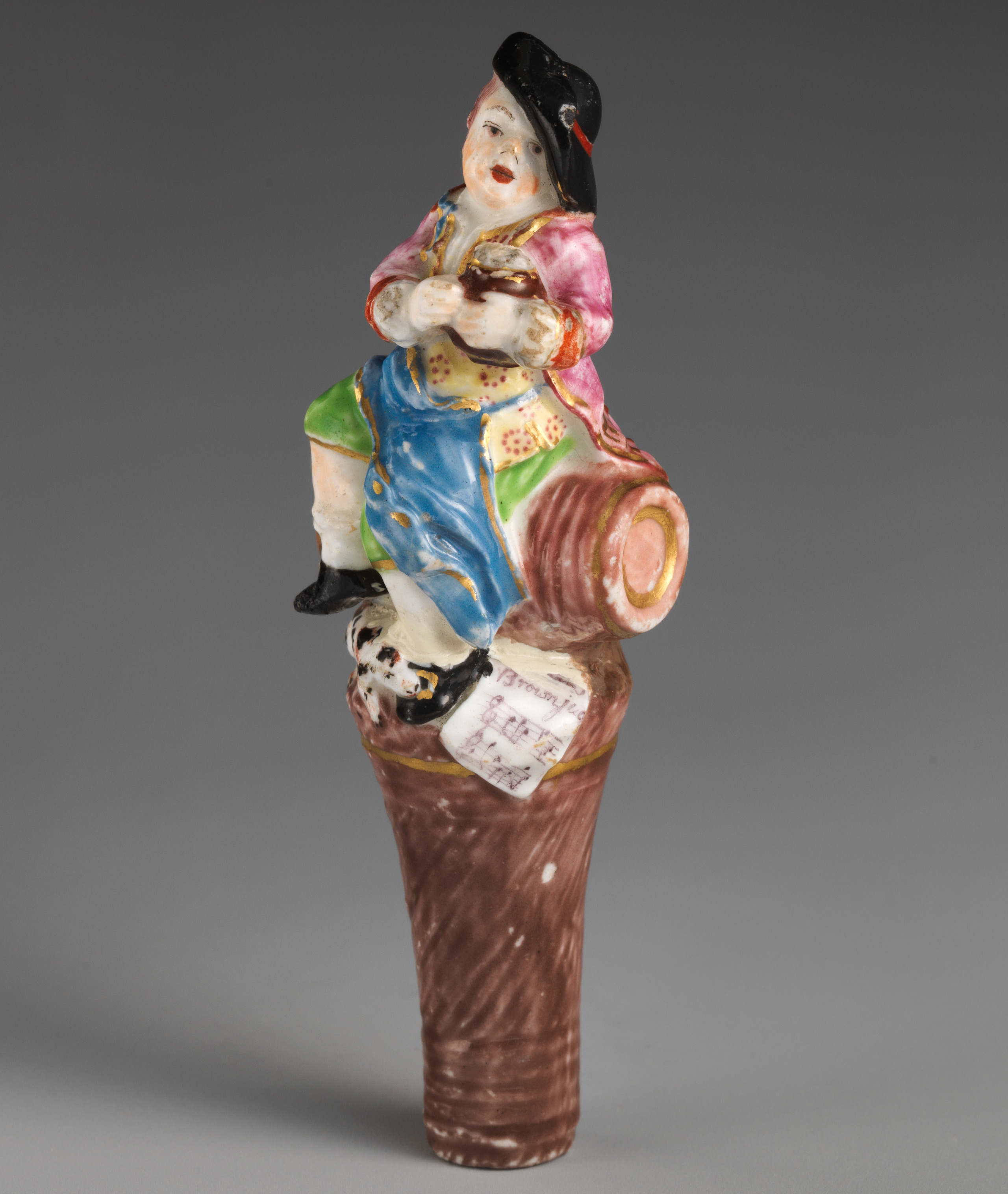
Porcelain figurine of John Barleycorn, complete with songsheet and little brown jug of beer

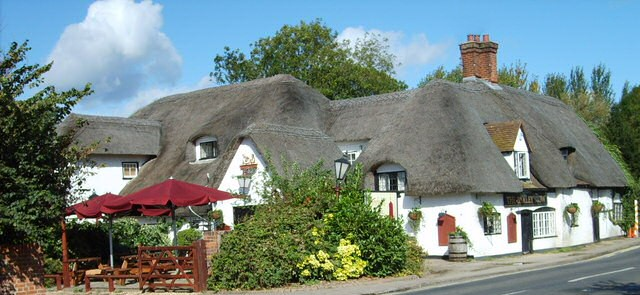
English pub names such as The Barley Mow (like this pub at Clifton Hampden) allude to the use of barley to make the beer available inside.
