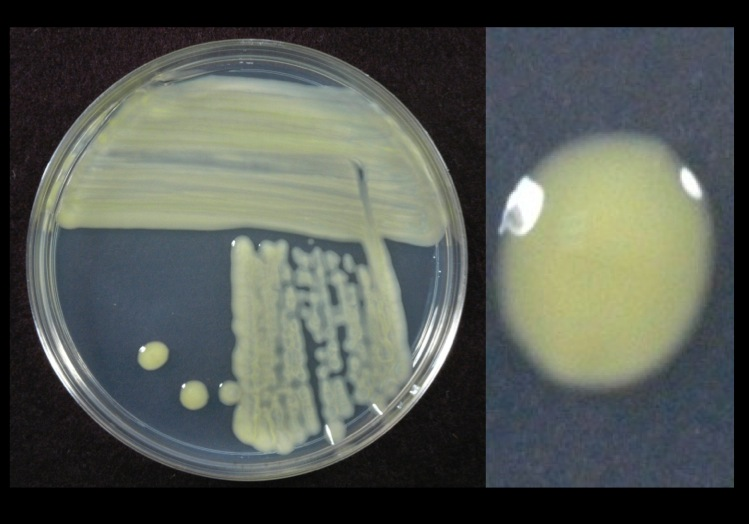

Scientific classification
- Domain: Bacteria
- Kingdom: Pseudomonadati
- Phylum: Pseudomonadota
- Class: Gammaproteobacteria
- Order: Lysobacterales
- Family: Lysobacteraceae
- Genus: Xanthomonas
- Species: X. translucens

Binomial name
- Xanthomonas translucens (ex. Jones et al. 1917) Vauterin et al. 1995

Type strain
- ATCC 19319; CFBP 2054; DSM 18974; ICMP 5752; LMG 876; NCPPB 973

= Xanthomonas translucens =

Disease-causing bacterium of cereals

Xanthomonas translucens is a species of phytopathogenic bacteria. It is the causal agent of bacterial leaf streak in of wheat and cereal crop. The bacterium is transmitted as a seed-borne pathogen. The transmission rate is very low but ensures serious outbreaks in the field under suitable conditions. The pathogen is a non-sporing, aerobic, motile, gram-negative, rod bacterium with a single polar flagellum.

== Subspecies ==
X. t. pv. translucens (syn. X. campestris pv. translucens) causes a bacterial leaf streak of wheat. Xts medium is developed and presented in Schaad & Forster 1985. Xts medium is semi-selective for Xtt. Although some problems with this agar are known, nothing better is available.

== Genome sequencing ==
The genomes of numerous Xanthomonas translucens strains and pathovars have been sequenced, providing significant insights into the pathogen's genetic diversity, evolution, and mechanisms of virulence. The first complete genome sequence of a pathotype strain, X. t. pv. translucens DSM 18974T, was published in 2016. This was followed by a comprehensive project in 2022 that published the complete genomes for the ten other pathotype strains of X. translucens, greatly expanding the genomic resources for the species.

In 2022, the first complete genome of a South American strain, X. translucens pv. undulosa MAI5034, was published. This strain was isolated from wheat in Uruguay. The DNA library construction and sequencing for this project were performed in Belgium. The sequence is available in the GenBank database.
