= List of oat diseases =

This article is a list of diseases of the cultivated oat Avena sativa.

== Bacterial diseases ==
Bacterial diseases
Bacterial blight (halo blight)	Pseudomonas coronafaciens pv. coronafaciens
Bacterial stripe blight	Pseudomonas coronafaciens pv. striafaciens
Black chaff and bacterial streak (stripe)	Xanthomonas campestris pv. translucens

== Fungal diseases ==
Fungal diseases
Anthracnose	Colletotrichum graminicola Glomerella graminicola [teleomorph]
Blast	Unfavorable environmental conditions and/or any of several pathogens
Downy mildew	Sclerophthora macrospora
Ergot	Claviceps purpurea Sphacelia segetum [anamorph]
Fusarium foot rot	Fusarium culmorum
Head blight	Bipolaris sorokiniana Cochliobolus sativus [teleomorph] Drechslera avenacea Fusarium graminearum Gibberella zeae [teleomorph] Other Fusarium spp.
Leaf blotch and crown rot (Helminthosporium leaf blotch)	Drechslera avenacea = Helminthosporium avenaceum Drechslera avenae = Helminthosporium avenae Pyrenophora avenae [teleomorph]
Powdery mildew	Blumeria avenae
Red leather disease	Spermospora avenae [anamorph]
Rhizoctonia root rot	Rhizoctonia solani Thanatephorus cucumeris [teleomorph]
Root rot	Bipolaris sorokiniana Cochliobolus sativus [teleomorph] Fusarium spp. Pythium spp. P. debaryanum P. irregulare P. ultimum
Rust, crown	Puccinia coronata
Rust, stem	Puccinia graminis
Seedling blight	Bipolaris sorokiniana Cochliobolus sativus [teleomorph] Drechslera avenae Fusarium culmorum Pythium spp. Rhizoctonia solani
Sharp eyespot	Rhizoctonia cerealis Ceratobasidium cereale [teleomorph]
Smut, covered	Ustilago segetum = U. kolleri
Smut, loose	Ustilago avenae
Snow mold, pink (Fusarium patch)	Microdochium nivale = Fusarium nivale Monographella nivalis [teleomorph]
Snow mold, speckled or gray (Typhula blight)	T. idahoensis T. incarnata T. ishikariensis
Speckled blotch (Septoria blight)	Stagonospora avenae = Septoria avenae Phaeosphaeria avenaria [teleomorph]
Take-all (white head)	Gaeumannomyces graminis var. avenae Other G. graminis strains
Victoria blight	Bipolaris victoriae Cochliobolus victoriae [teleomorph]

== Miscellaneous diseases or disorders ==
Miscellaneous diseases or disorders
Blast	Unfavorable environmental conditions and/or any of several pathogens
Gray streak	Manganese deficiency
Physiological leaf spot	Genetic predisposition

== Nematodes ==
Nematodes, parasitic
Bulb and stem	Ditylenchus dipsaci
Cyst, oat or cereal	Heterodera avenae
Cyst	Heterodera hordecalis Heterodera latipons Punctodera chalcoensis
Dagger, American	Xiphinema americanum
Lesion	Pratylenchus spp. Pratylenchus thornei
Pin	Pratylenchus spp.
Ring	Criconemella spp. Nothocriconemella mutabilis and other spp.
Root-knot	Meloidogyne spp. M. chitwoodi M. naasi
Sheath	Hemicycliophora spp.
Spiral	Helicotylenchus spp.
Sting	Belonolaimus longicaudatus
Stubby-root	Paratrichodorus minor
Stunt	Quinisulcius capitatus Tylenchorhynchus spp. Merlinius spp.

== Viruses ==
Viruses
Oat blue dwarf	Oat blue dwarf virus
Oat mosaic	Oat mosaic virus
Oat necrotic mottle	Oat necrotic mottle virus
Oat red leaf	Barley yellow dwarf virus
