= Agriculture in Finland =

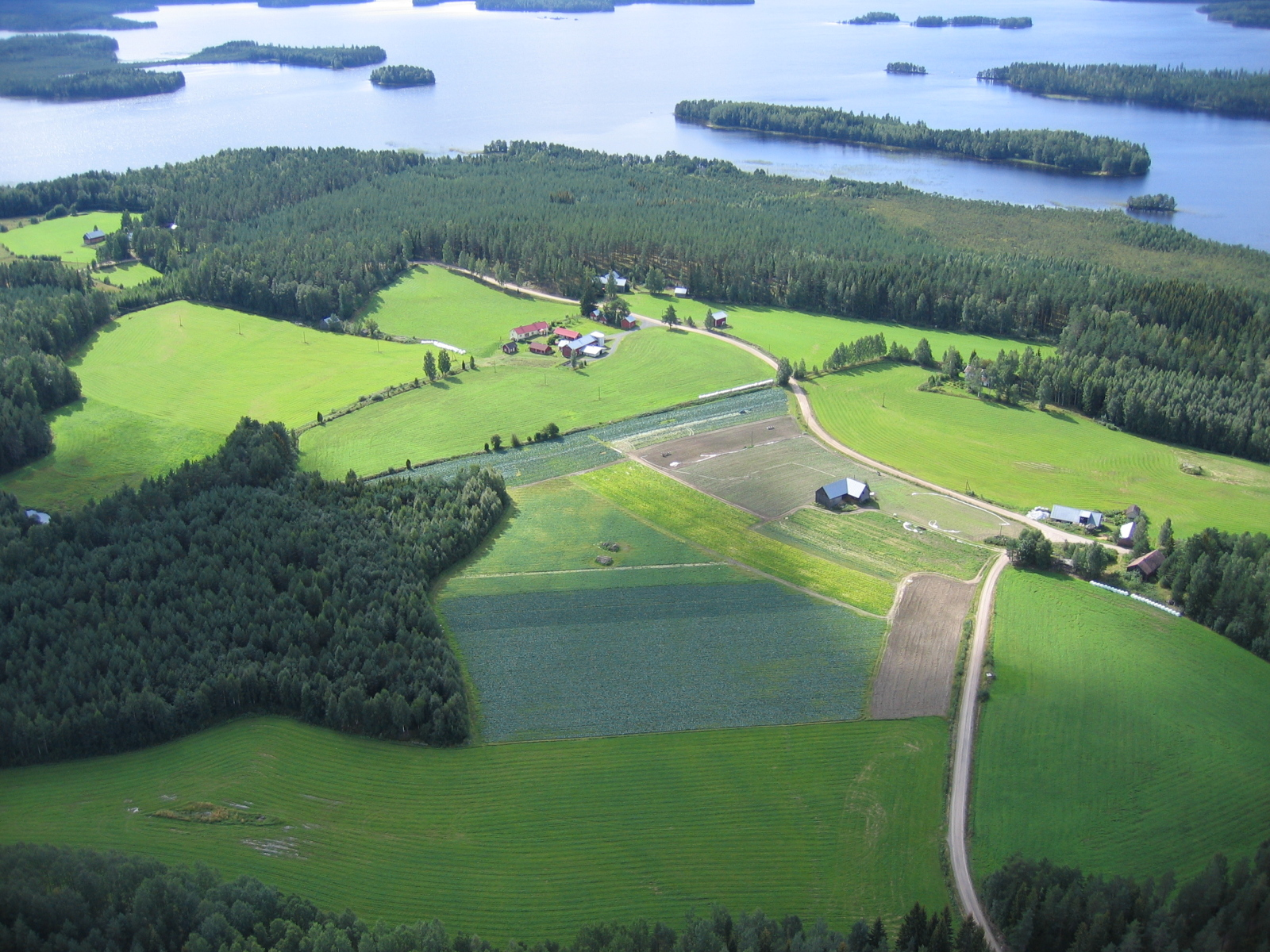
Farm and fields in Mäntyharju, eastern Finland

Agriculture in Finland is characterized by the northern climate and self-sufficiency in most major agricultural products. Its economic role is declining in terms of GNP and employment in primary production, but together with the food industry and forestry with which it is linked, it forms a significant part of the Finnish economy. The number of farms has steadily declined over recent decades. Their number fell from almost 80,000 in 2000 to about 60,000 in 2012, while the amount of arable land has slightly increased to a total of almost 2.3 million hectares. Agriculture employed 125,000 people in 2010, which is a drop of 30 percent from 2000.

A study examined job resources, work engagement and Finnish dairy farmers' preferences concerning methods to enhance overall well-being while working on farms. The results indicate that the family, working with cattle, healthy farm animals, a reasonable workload, and a sustainable farm economy have the capacity to create positive impacts on well-being among dairy farmers. Well-being on farms is a part of sustainable food production.

== Geography ==
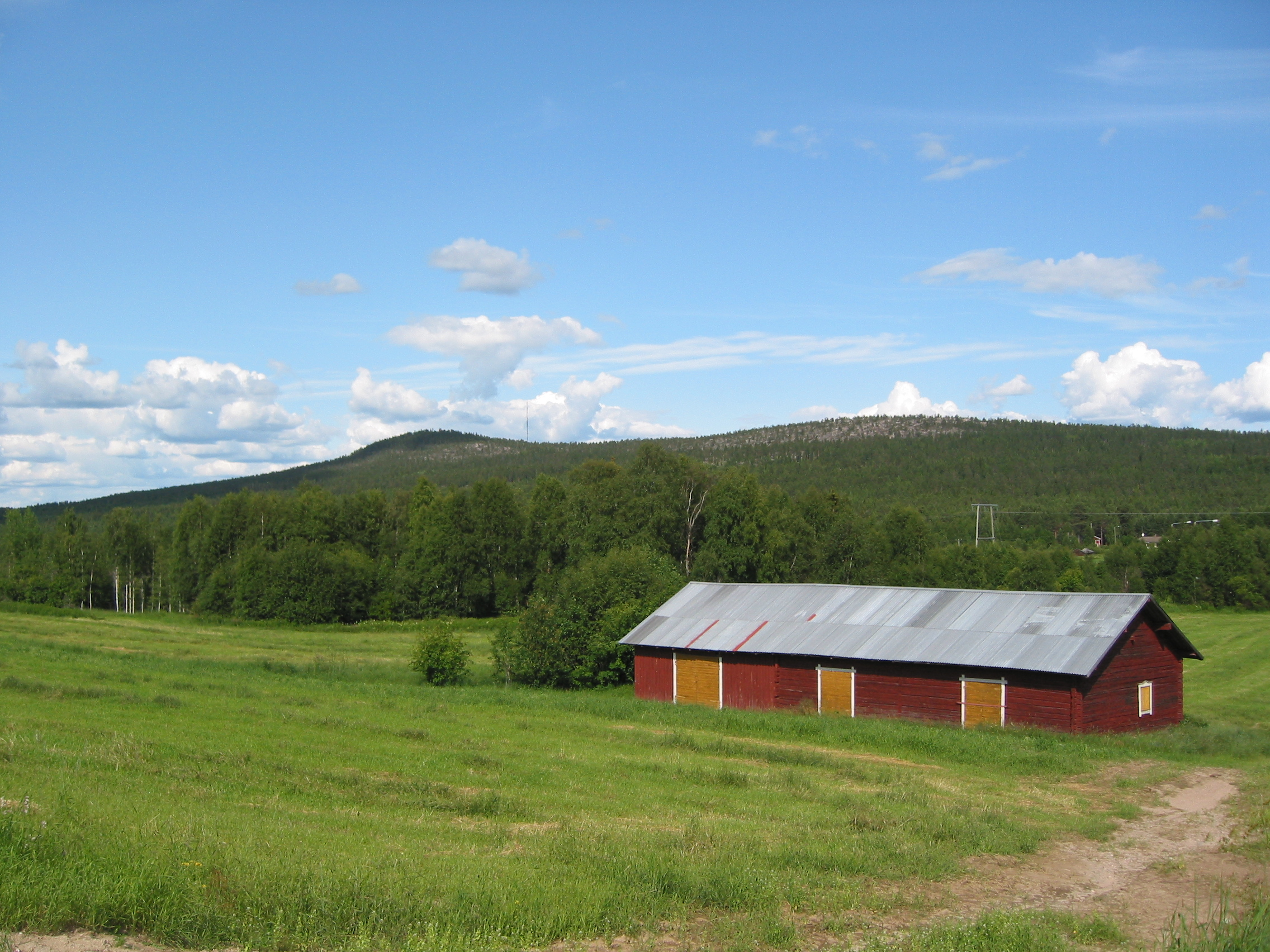
Hay field by Aavasaksa, Ylitornio (66°24′N).

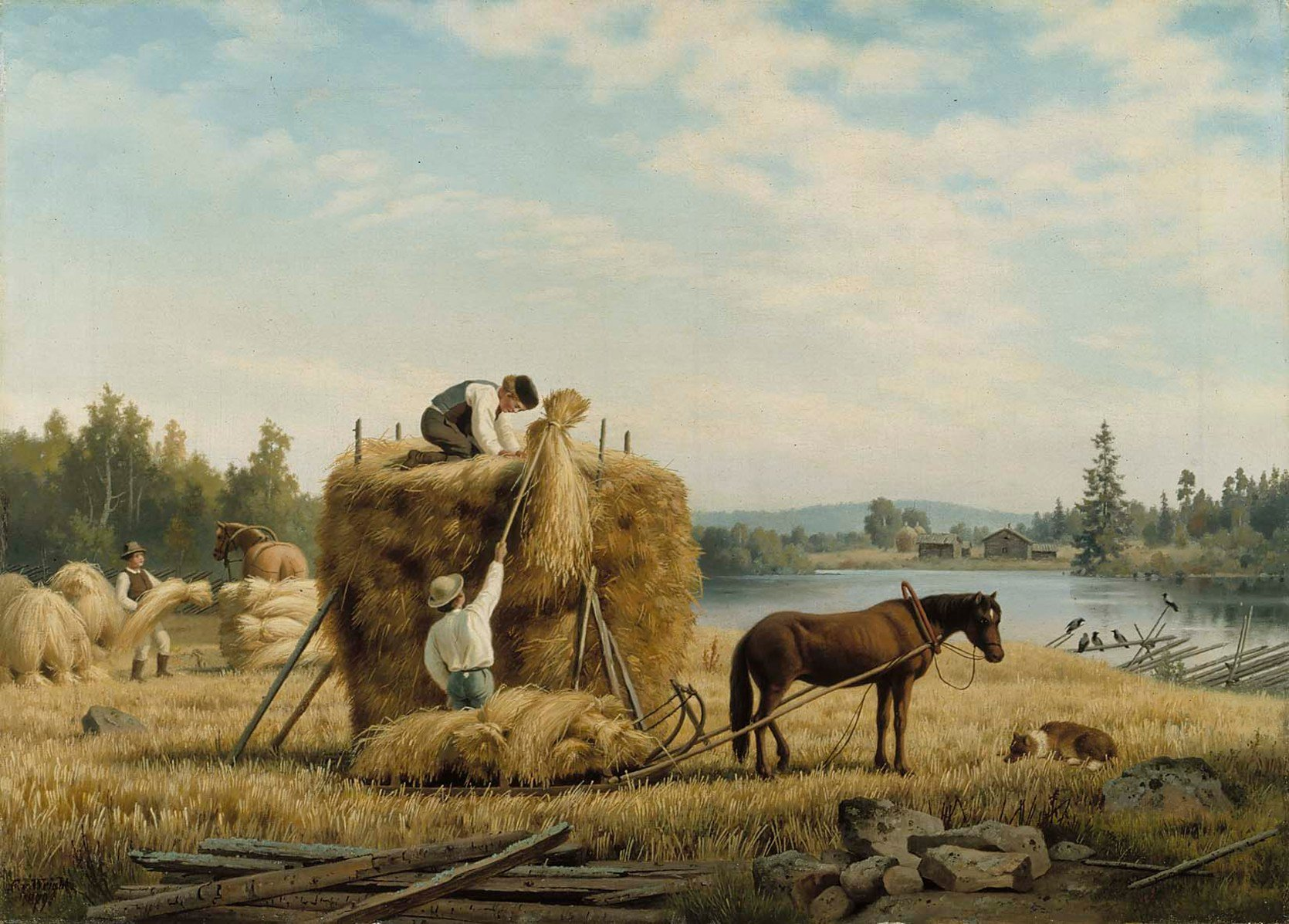
Harvesters in Finland in 1879, by Ferdinand von Wright

The majority of farms and agricultural land in Finland lie between the 60th and 65th parallel, making it the only country in the world with a significant agricultural sector so far in the north. The percentage of farms concentrating on animal production increases towards the north and east.

== Production ==
Finland produced in 2018:

- 1.3 million tons of barley;
- 818 thousand tons of oats (9th largest producer in the world);
- 600 thousand tons of potato;
- 494 thousand tons of wheat;
- 355 thousand tons of sugar beet, which is used to produce sugar and ethanol;
- 70 thousand tons of rapeseed;
- 67 thousand tons of carrot;
- 55 thousand tons of cucumber;
- 42 thousand tons of rye;
- 39 thousand tons of tomato;

In addition to smaller productions of other agricultural products.

== Pests ==
As with the other Nordics, the disease situation is slightly different because this is the northernmost cereal cultivation area in the world. In 2009 the worst pathogens were: on barley, the fungal leaf spots (Drechslera teres, Cochliobolus sativus, Rhynchosporium secalis), and possibly Fusarium langsethiae and Ramularia collo-cygni in the future; on spring wheat, the leaf blotch diseases; on oat, Pyrenophora chaetomioides, Phaeosphaeria avenaria, C. sativus, and possibly F. langsethiae in the future; rarely powdery mildew and yellow rust. The benefit of fungicide is 11% in barley and 13% in spring wheat. Fungicides are used by 73% of cereal farmers.

Monographella nivalis and Puccinia recondita routinely plague winter rye. Native cultivars are usually more well suited to the native disease and abiotic environment (with the exception of one variety and one disease). Late-sowing is the better disease management strategy in Finland.

Puccinia triticina (wheat leaf rust) commonly appears late in the wheat season. Severe losses are rare but do occur with a combination of susceptible cultivars, mild winter, and further favorable weather through the rest of the season. The most common resistance gene deployed between 1992 and 2002 was Lr10 at 20.0% (less popular were Lr14a and Lr26). The most popular cultivars were: for spring wheat, 'Tjalve' (no Lrs), 'Mahti' (Lr10), 'Vinjett' (Lr14a), 'Kruunu' (Lr10), 'Bastian' (none), 'Zebra' (Lr14a), 'Manu' (unknown) and 'Anniina' (unknown); and for winter wheat, 'Tryggve' (unknown), 'Urho' (unknown), 'Tarso' (Lr26+other unknown), 'Aura' (unknown), 'Ilves' (none), 'Gunbo' and 'Ramiro'. 20% of cultivars had no noticeable resistance. The existing leaf rust virulence pattern likely reflects selection by the Lrs that have been deployed up to now.

== See also ==
- Great Famine of 1695–1697
- Finnish famine of 1866–1868
