= Lutypha =

Scientific classification
- Kingdom: Fungi
- Division: Basidiomycota
- Class: Agaricomycetes
- Order: Agaricales
- Family: Typhulaceae
- Genus: Lutypha; Khurana, K.S.Thind & Berthier (1977)

Type species
- Lutypha sclerotiophila Khurana, K.S.Thind & Berthier (1977)

Genus of fungi

Lutypha is a genus of fungi in the family Typhulaceae. The genus is monotypic, containing the single clavarioid species Lutypha sclerotiophila, found in India. The generic name is an anagram of Typhula, a genus with which it has affinities.
