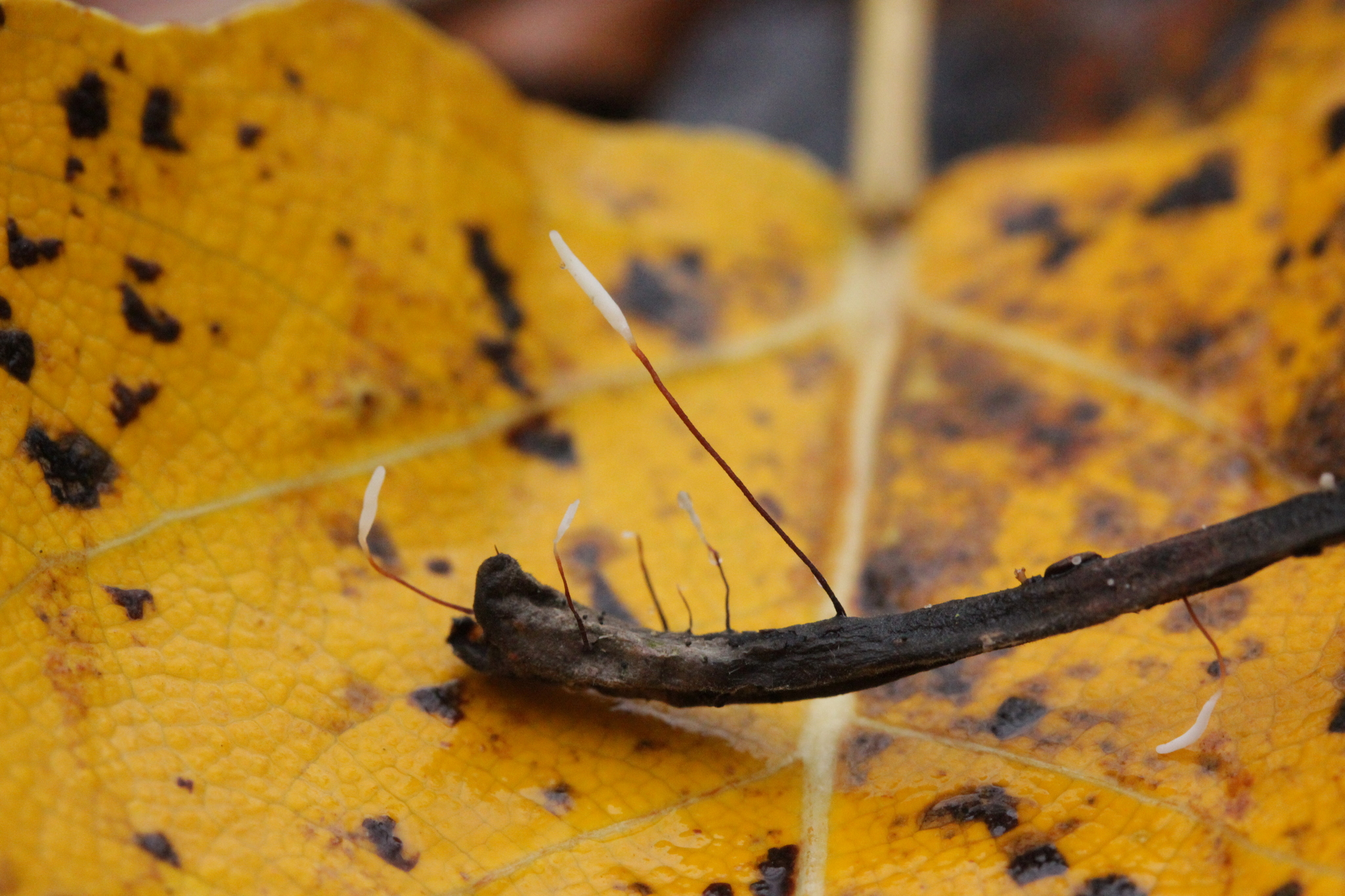

Scientific classification
- Domain: Eukaryota
- Kingdom: Fungi
- Division: Basidiomycota
- Class: Agaricomycetes
- Order: Agaricales
- Family: Typhulaceae
- Genus: Typhula
- Species: T. erythropus

Binomial name
- Typhula erythropus (Pers.) Fr.

= Typhula erythropus =

Species of fungus

Typhula erythropus is a species of fungus in the family Typhulaceae, first described by Christiaan Hendrik Persoon and given its current name by Elias Magnus Fries.

== Morphology ==
Fruiting bodies are 1.5 cm high, and spores have dimensions of 9–10 × 3–4 μm.

== Distribution and habitat ==
It appears in North America, Europe and Asia, most often in Europe. It grows on petioles, stems and twigs of species such as Alnus, Populus, Acer, Fagus and Fraxinus, rarely on grass, Urtica and Pteridium.
