= Typhula ishikariensis =

Scientific classification
- Kingdom: Fungi
- Division: Basidiomycota
- Class: Agaricomycetes
- Order: Agaricales
- Family: Typhulaceae
- Genus: Typhula
- Species: T. ishikariensis

Binomial name
- Typhula ishikariensis S.Imai (1930)

Synonyms
- Typhula idahoensis

Species of fungus

Typhula ishikariensis is, along with Typhula incarnata, the causal agent of grey snow mould (also called speckled snow mould or Typhula blight), an obligately parasitic plant pathogen that can destroy turfgrass when covered for a long period with snow. It is a particular problem on golf courses established in unsuitable areas. More importantly, it can also damage crops of winter wheat. The species was described as new to science in 1930 by Japanese mycologist Sanshi Imai. The varieties canadensis and ishikariensis (the former as a new combination) were described in 1978. There is a wide variety within the species and not all authorities agree as to subspecies, or even whether it should be monophyletic.

== Taxonomy ==
There is a wide range of morphology, physiology, and genetics. Some test have shown Typhula idahoensis to be interfertile, or not to be; and there are significant morphological and range differences; and so it is sometimes regarded as a subspecies or non-synonymous entirely. Some schemes have a var. ishikariensis, var. idahoensis, and var. canadiensis along the lines of basidiocarp and sclerotial morphology. North American populations all have high genetic similarity. Japanese populations appear to be two intersterile biotypes, A and B. Norwegian populations have been proposed to be group I, II, and III based on culture preferences and differences of interfertility with Japanese populations; I and II are also differentiated from III by being cold temperate, while III is Arctic adapted. Another proposal divides the worldwide population into two species, I and II, based on morphology and interfertility: I including Japanese A above, North American ishikariensis and idahoensis, and Norwegian I and III, with hosts monocots, dicots, conifer seedlings, and in Russia the roots of hops; II including Japanese B, North American canadiensis, and Norwegian II, only harming monocots. Genetic factors governing sclerotial size vary widely across the world, and differences between Japanese B and Polish populations have been studied and are pronounced.

It is broadly agreed that there is some degree of differentiation within the species along the lines of winter weather in the various locales.

== Physiology ==
=== Temperature ===
Minimum growth temperature is below −7 °C (19 °F). Optimal growth range is 5–10 °C (41–50 °F). Maximum growth temperature 20 °C (68 °F). Norwegian groups I and II are colder temperate populations (optimal growth 10 °C (50 °F)), while group III is purely Arctic (irregular growth at 10 °C (50 °F), no hyphal growth at 15 °C (59 °F)). Canadian population exposed to 20 °C (68 °F) and then incubated at optimal growth temperature showed irregular growth similar to Norwegian III's reaction to 10 °C (50 °F) above, suggesting similar ill-adaptation to temperatures outside the Arctic.

Maximum oxygen consumption is at 20 °C (68 °F), which is higher than optimal growth temp.

After being stored at −40 °C (−40 °F) and then incubated at 10 °C (50 °F), Norwegian I (southern Norway) showed delay resumption of lifecycle (i.e. growth), while III from Finnmark (northern Norway) stored at the same temp and incubated at 4 °C (39 °F) (optimal growth temp) immediately resumed growth. Isolates from Moscow died from the stress of freezing, but there was no lethality or even delay due to freezing of isolates from Novosibirsk in central Siberia (considered equivalent to Norwegian III).

Norwegian III does not actually avoid freezing, in fact freezing before reaching −10 °C (14 °F) and so its freeze tolerance may not be (or not be entirely) due to antifreeze proteins, but extracellular ice formation may play some protective role.

Freeze/thaw cycling killed off significant numbers of sclerotia of Norwegian I and Moscow isolates, while Norwegian III and Siberian showed no mortality.

When divided into the two worldwide divisions I and II (as described in §Taxonomy above), a period of freezing halved the growth rate of I, but only brought it down to 80% for II.

Exposure to lethal heat of 22 °C (72 °F) or 30 °C (86 °F) both decreased protein content of the mycelia.

=== Osmoregulation ===
Does not grow well on lower-water potato dextrose agar, unlike some snow moulds (such as Sclerotinia borealis which is more adapted to continue parasitizing plant tissues in frozen soil).

=== Lipid metabolism ===
T. ishikariensis produces betaine lipids.

=== Protein metabolism ===
Low amounts of sclerotinial proteins do occur in the vegetative hyphae - whether produced there or progressing into there - during normal growth at 5 °C (41 °F).

== Morphology ==
Dark amber to dark chestnut sclerotia when not desiccated, dark brown to almost black when desiccated. Sclerotia not gelatinous. Clavulae of sporophores pale yellow to gray white, transition to gray brown on the stipes. Genetic factors governing sclerotial size vary widely across the world: Specifically in Japanese B, long snowcover selects for larger, and brief snowcover for smaller; while in Polish populations, incubation temp was significant and overwhelmed genetic factors, more often producing smaller sclerotia. Across the world, smaller sclerotia are an adaptation to shorter or highly variable duration of snow cover, and strongly for the combination of the two.

== Symptomology ==
Speckled, hence the common name.

== Hosts ==
Grasses, forages, and winter cereals.

== Distribution ==
S. ishikariensis is found in cool temperate areas, frigid zone areas, and into the Arctic, including northern Japan, Russia, northern Scandinavia, and North America. Specifically including Arctic areas of Alaska, the Yukon, Greenland, Finnmark county in Norway (especially group III), Finnish Lapland, Swedish Lapland, Svalbard (especially group III), and Greenland (especially group III).

Further south, Switzerland, southern Siberia, southern and central Norway (especially groups I and II), and the Mie Prefecture on Honshu in Japan.

Any grassland getting more than 150 days of snow cover.
