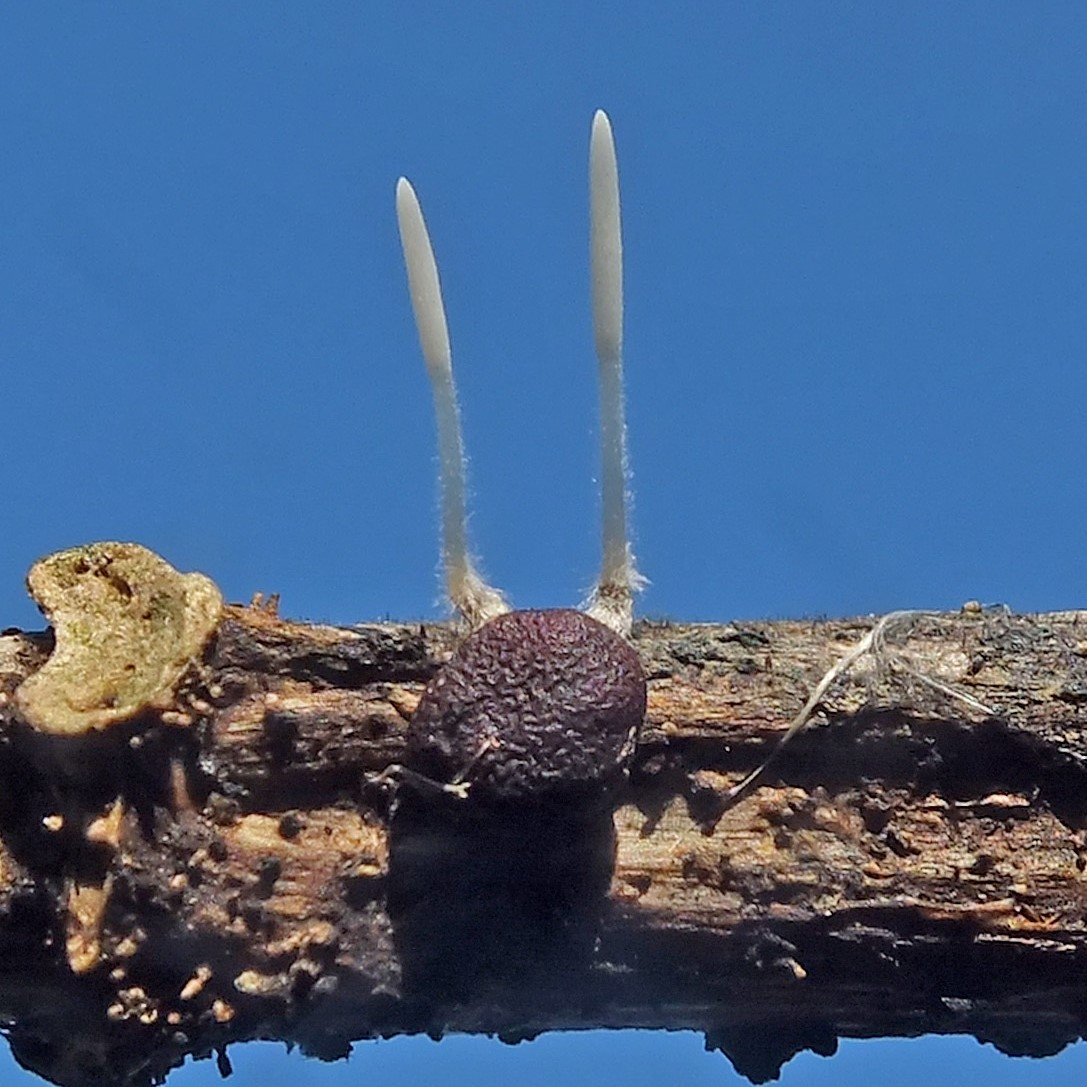

Scientific classification
- Kingdom: Fungi
- Division: Basidiomycota
- Class: Agaricomycetes
- Order: Agaricales
- Family: Typhulaceae
- Genus: Typhula
- Species: T. variabilis

Binomial name
- Typhula variabilis Riess, (1850)

Synonyms
- List: Craterellus variabilis (Riess) Quél.; Sclerotium semen Tode, (1790); Typhula betae Rostr., (1881); Typhula intermedia K.R. Appel & Laubert, (1905); Typhula laschii Rabenh., (1849); Typhula semen Quél., (1877)

= Typhula variabilis =

Species of fungus

Typhula variabilis is a species of clavarioid fungus in the family Typhulaceae. It is a plant pathogen that infects carrots.
