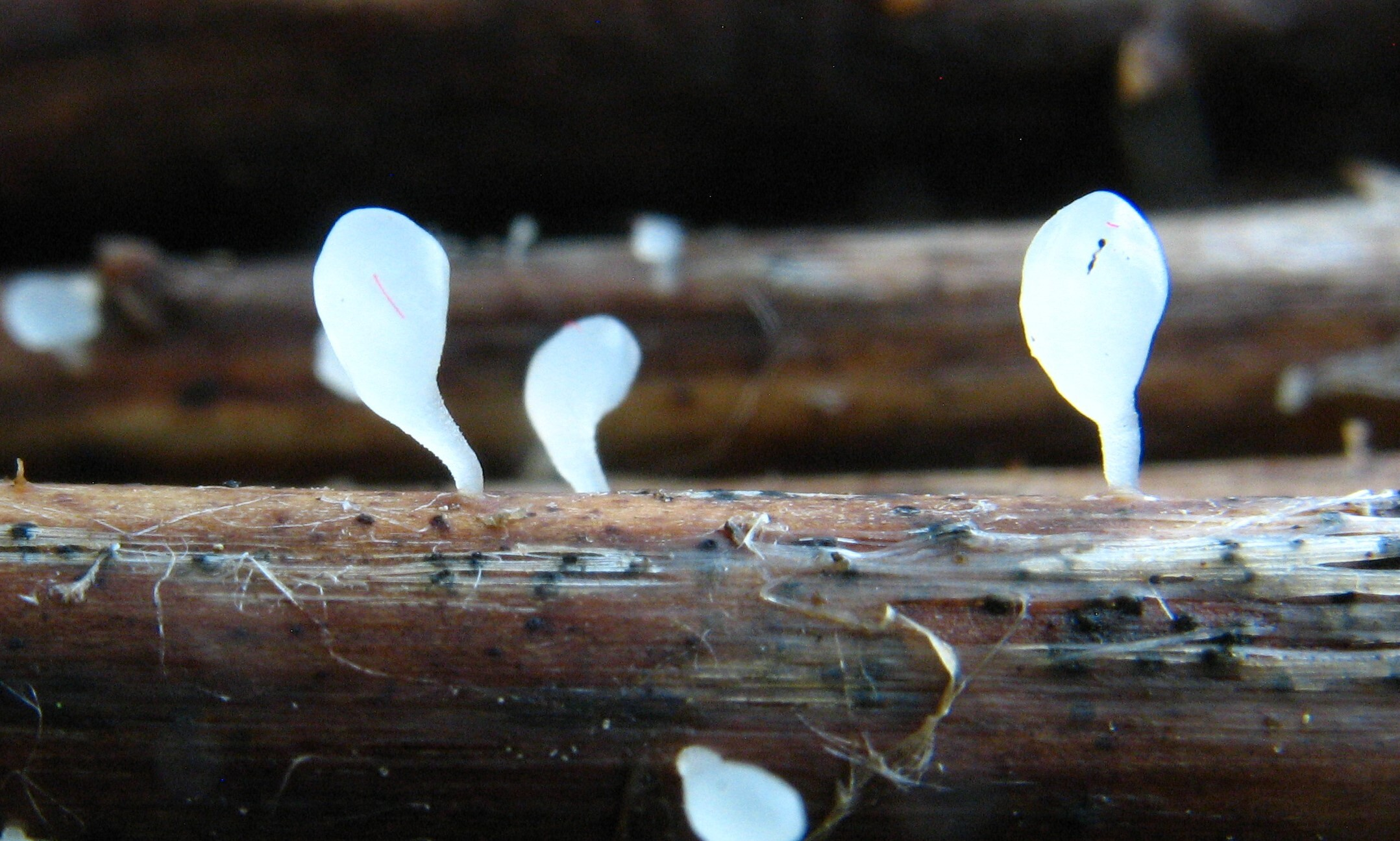

Scientific classification
- Domain: Eukaryota
- Kingdom: Fungi
- Division: Basidiomycota
- Class: Agaricomycetes
- Order: Agaricales
- Family: Typhulaceae
- Genus: Typhula
- Species: T. uncialis

Binomial name
- Typhula uncialis (Grev.) Berthier

= Typhula uncialis =

Species of fungus

Typhula uncialis is a species of fungus in the family Typhulaceae, first described by Robert Kaye Greville and given its current name by Jacques Berthier.

== Distribution and habitat ==
It appears in North America, Europe and Asia, most often in Europe. It grows on petioles of species such as Petasites, esp. Petasites kablikianus.
