= Ruokatieto =

Ruokatieto Yhdistys ry (English: Finfood - Finnish Food Information) is a Finnish non-governmental, non-profit inter-trade association that promotes food production and food culture in Finland. The main objective of the association is to raise the awareness of Finnish consumers of all ages towards food and promote the aspects of the food sector:

- agriculture, agricultural products and food culture
- food value chains
- the impact of food to health and wellbeing
- the impact of the food industry to employment and economy
- and support the improvement of food quality and safety

The association also promotes and communicates these aspects in the EU and globally. In addition to promotional activities, the daily operations also involve advocacy, research and education, which are used to support the communication within the food industry and the promotion of the food sector. As the center for Finnish Food Information, the association implements several forums:

Ruokatieto.fi -website: The website reveals the journey taken by food produce from field to table, introduces the richness of Finnish food culture, and offers food education materials to educators on all levels. Food education: Popular study materials are produced for teachers and pupils to be used in schools, as well as for consumers with an interest in food. Study materials are available for all levels of education ranging from preschool to university.

Forkful of Facts – Food Industry Statistics (Finnish: Tietohaarukka): Ruokatieto Yhdistys ry publishes annually a brochure of food industry statistics (available on website for download in Finnish, Swedish and English). It contains a wide variety of figures concerning Finnish agriculture covering the entire food chain from field to fork.

Hyvää Suomesta: Label for designation of origin for Finnish packaged foods, the label is owned and administered by Ruokatieto Yhdistys ry. The label Hyvää Suomesta (Good from Finland), has been implemented since 1993. The use of label is voluntary and may be used by food companies that manufacture their products in Finland using Finnish ingredients. The label is currently used by approximately 330 food producers and on 12,000 different products.

== History ==
Founded in 1960, the association has its roots in providing agricultural information in Finland as it has also been known as Agricultural Information Center in the past. Starting from 1993, organisations of the food industry and trade were also allowed membership. The current name Ruokatieto Yhdistys ry was applied in 2010.

== See also ==
- Agriculture in Finland
- Finnish cuisine
