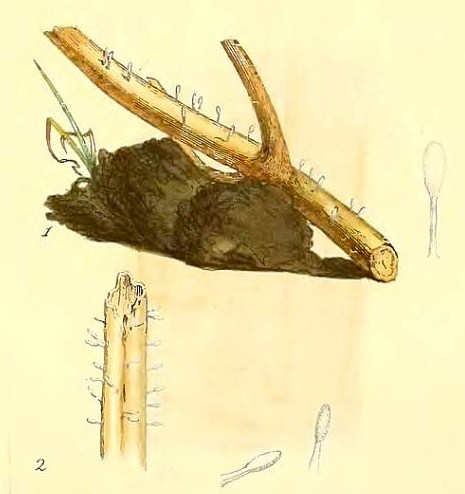
- Typhula quisquiliaris, as illustrated by James Sowerby

Scientific classification
- Kingdom: Fungi
- Division: Basidiomycota
- Class: Agaricomycetes
- Order: Agaricales
- Family: Typhulaceae
- Genus: Typhula
- Species: T. quisquiliaris

Binomial name
- Typhula quisquiliaris (Fr.) Henn. 1896

Synonyms
- List: Clavaria obtusa Sowerby 1803; Geoglossum obtusum (Sowerby) Gray 1821; Clavaria quisquiliaris Fr. 1818; Pistillaria quisquiliaris (Fr.) Fr. 1821; Pistillaria puberula Berk. 1860

= Typhula quisquiliaris =

Species of fungus

Typhula quisquiliaris, commonly known as the bracken club, is a species of club fungus in the family Typhulaceae. It produces small, white fruit bodies up to 9 millimetres (0.4 in) in height, each with a single distinct "head" and "stem". The head is fertile, while the stem attaches to a sclerotium embedded in the substrate. The fruit bodies grow from dead wood, and strongly favours bracken, where the species feeds saprotrophically. Though T. quisquiliaris was described under a different name by James Sowerby in 1803, the specific name quisquiliaris was sanctioned in 1821 by Elias Magnus Fries, and the species was moved to the genus Typhula, which resulted in its currently accepted binomial name by Paul Christoph Hennings in 1896. The species has been recorded in Europe and north Africa.

== Taxonomy ==
Typhula quisquiliaris was first described by James Sowerby in 1803 as Clavaria obtusa. However, this name was found to be illegitimate, as it had already been given to a different species by Christiaan Hendrik Persoon in 1797. The species was given its sanctioned name several years later by Elias Magnus Fries, in his 1821 Systema Mycologicum. Fries named the species Pistillaria quisquiliaris, having previously (in 1818) named it Clavaria quisquiliaris. The specific name quisquiliaris is from the Latin meaning "pertaining to refuse". In the same year, Samuel Frederick Gray reclassified Sowerby's Clavaria obtusa, naming it Geoglossum obtusum. Fries's name was taken up as the valid one, however, and in 1896, Paul Christoph Hennings transferred the species to Typhula, giving the species the name by which it is known today. However, the name Pistillaria quisquiliaris was sometimes used into the 20th century. For instance, Carleton Rea used it in a 1922 publication. The species is commonly known as the bracken club.

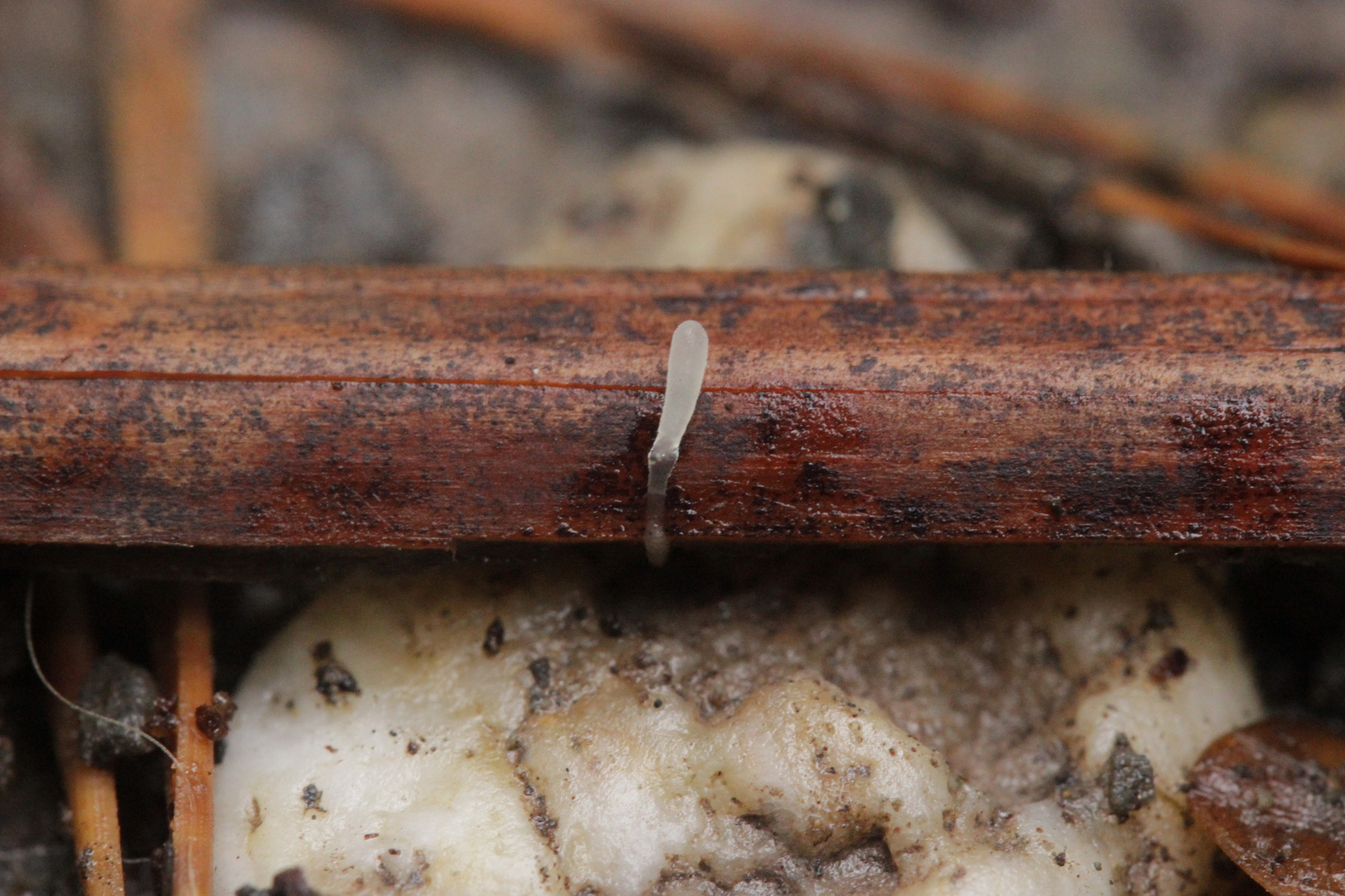
Typhula quisquiliaris on bracken

== Description ==
Typhula quisquiliaris Mycological characteristics
- Smooth hymenium
- No distinct cap
- Hymenium attachment is irregular or not applicable
- Lacks a stipe
- Ecology is saprotrophic

Typhula quisquiliaris produces fruit bodies in the form of clubs. Each fruit body consists of a single distinct "stem" and "head", and measures up to 7 mm (0.3 in) in height. The surface of the head is smooth and white, and measures 1.5 to 4 mm (0.06 to 0.2 in) by 1 to 2.5 mm (0.04 to 0.1 in). The rounded stem is infertile, and of a similar colour to the head. However, it has a very fine downy covering, and is somewhat translucent. The stem measures from 0.3 to 0.4 mm (0.01 to 0.02 in) in width. The stem attaches to sclerotium which is buried into the branch from which the fruit body grows.

=== Microscopic characteristics ===
Typhula quisquiliaris spores are narrowly ellipsoid, and measure from 9 to 14 by 4 to 5.5 micrometres (μm). The spores are white, and contain small granules. The spores are borne on basidia which measure 50 to 70 by 7 to 8 μm, with four spores on each basidium. The downy covering of the stem is made up of thick-walled hairs, each measuring 15 to 60 by 3 to 7 μm, though they are often swollen towards the base. The sclerotium measures from 1.5 to 3 by 0.5 μm, and is a pale yellow colour. Clamp connections are present in the hyphae.

== Habitat and distribution ==
Typhula quisquiliaris fruit bodies are typically found in rows, growing from plant detritus. The species favours bracken, especially Pteridium aquilinum, but the colonisation of dead matter from other plants is not unknown. Upon these substrates, it feeds as a saprotroph, breaking down the dead organic matter in order to sustain itself. The species has been recorded in Europe and northern Africa. In Europe, the fruit bodies can be encountered from April to December.
