= Pyrenophora teres f. maculata =

Scientific classification
- Kingdom: Fungi
- Division: Ascomycota
- Class: Dothideomycetes
- Order: Pleosporales
- Family: Pleosporaceae
- Genus: Pyrenophora
- Species: P. teres
- Forma: P. t. f. maculata

Trionomial name
- Pyrenophora teres f. maculata Smed.-Pet.

Fungal plant pathogen

Pyrenophora teres f. maculata is a plant pathogen causing spot form net blotch in barley.

Fungal authority Species Fungorum regards this form to be a synonym of Pyrenophora teres.
