= Fellutamide =

Group of chemical compounds from fungi

Fellutamide A

Fellutamide B

Fellutamides are tripeptide derivatives from Penicillium fellutanum and other fungi. Fellutamide is classified as a secondary metabolite, which are low weight molecular compounds involved in growth, development, and reproductive properties. They are potent proteasome inhibitor that stimulates nerve growth factor synthesis in vitro. Fellutamides based on their derivative were isolated from fungi such as: Penicillium fellutanum, Aspergillus vesicolor, Metulocladosporiella sp., Penicillium purpurogenum G59, and Aspergillus nidulans. The derivatives have differences in structure that are marked by differences in the length of the hydroxylated fatty acyl chain located on the N-terminus.

Mycobacterium tuberculosis

Fellutamide has multiple variants ranging from A to F, though A and B tend to be more common. Fellutamide A and fellutamide B are derived from fellutamide and the derivatives are considered cytotoxic peptides. This was determined based on fellutamide A and fellutamide B both having half maximal inhibitory concentrations against human epidermoid carcinoma, a type of cancer. Fellutamide itself was isolated from a marine fish called Apogen endekataenia Bleeker, specifically its gastrointestine. The characteristics of fellutamide are a C-terminus aldehyde and a (3R)-beta-hydroxy alkanoate tail. When comparing all A-D derivatives, A,B, and C all have a non-ribosomal amino acid present and D doesn't. Similarly, only fellutamide A and B have a beta-hydroxylated fatty chain, while C and D do not. Fellutamide B strongly inhibits the growth of the tuberculosis-causing bacterium Mycobacterium tuberculosis. Its biosynthetic pathway has been determined in the filamentous fungus Aspergillus nidulans.

Only the synthesis of fellutamide B has been achieved. Fellutamides A and F were first isolated from Aspergillus versicolor. Fellutamides C and D were first isolated from an undescribed Metulocladosporiella (Chaetothyriales). The overall discovery of fellutamide derivatives, spanning from fellutamide A - fellutamide F, was through screening for cytotoxic compounds or antifungal agents.

== Fellutamide A ==
Fellutamide A is derived from Penicillium fellutanum and it has a tripeptide structure, specifically a two peptide aldehydes. When looking at its function, it enhances the nerve growth factor synthesis. Its molecular formula is C_{27}H_{49}N_{5}O_{8} and through IR and NMR spectroscopy it was determine that: Leucinal, Beta-Hydroxyglutamine, Asparagine, and 3-Hydroxydodecanoic acid (HDA) were present on the structure of fellutamide A. It is reported that Fellutamide A, along with Fellutamide B, is cytotoxic specifically against murine leukemia cells and human epidermoid carcinoma KB cells.

== Fellutamide B ==
The molecular formula for fellutamide B is C_{27}H_{49}N_{5}O_{7} and when comparing with fellutamide A's formula, it has one less oxygen. This implies that fellutamide B is a deoxygenated form of fellutamide A. When looking specifically at the structure of the variant fellutamide B, it is classified as a lipopeptide aldehyde. Fellutamide B was derived from the marine fungus Penicillin fellutanum and is classified as being involved in stimulating nerve growth factor synthesis from specifically fibroblasts and glial-derived cells. It does this through the mechanism of proteasome inhibition and fellutamide B is considered a strong inhibitor. This was confirmed when fellutamide B was confirmed to be the most potent inhibitor of the Mycobacterium tuberculosis (Mtb) proteasome. Studies revealed that fellutamide B is able to inhibit Mtb proteasome, but this was also true for human proteasome. crystallization data was able to indicate that it inhibits activity through tight binding of the active sites. Through the tight binding, it is able to cause structural changes leading to an increase of selectivity for the M. tuberculosis proteasome. In this case of Mtb proteasome, fellutamide B goes through a single step binding mechanism for inhibition, while for the human proteasome it goes through a two-step mechanism. The mechanism of fellutamide B is also based on its peptide aldehyde structure as they're involved in classical reversible inhibitions. The inhibition occurs through the formation of a reversible bond with the alpha-OH of the active site, but an intermediate forms before. The intermediate forms from the Beta-hydroxyl groups of the active site forming a tetrahedral intermediate. Looking back at the Beta-hydroxylated or lipophilic tail of fellutamide B, studies show that it plays a key role in the cytotoxicity of the derivative. Looking more into the structure of fellutamide B, its adopts a peptide backbone in order to maintain stability when interacting with the active sites of proteasome. The Beta-hydroxyl aliphatic tail's structure utilizes the intermolecular force of van der Waals forces when interacting hydrophobic regions of protein residues.

It is also reported that fellutamide B is strong inhibitor of the human 20S CP, along with being the strongest inhibitor for Mycobacterium tuberculosis (Mtb) proteasome. Fellutamide B also has characteristics of antiproliferative activity against certain cells. These cells are: cancer cell lines (sarcoma S180), fibroblast, glioblastoma, glioma, and pheochromocytoma cell lines. To a small extent fellutamide B inhibits trypsin and caspase-like activities.

== Fellutamide C and fellutamide D ==
Fellutamide C and D were isolated from a fungus that was isolated from Equatorial Guinan soil called Metulocladosporiella. This isolation was conducted in 2011 by researcher Xu and his co-workers. Comparing fellutamide C and D to A and B, the proteasome that it specifically inhibits is fungal proteasome. This is in comparison to fellutamide A and B which target both MtB proteasome and human proteasome. This specific example of fungal proteasome is reported to be present in Candida fungal species. Further analysis of both fellutamide C and fellutamide D indicated that when comparing potency of both, fellutamide C was more potent in comparison. Looking at the structural components of both C and D, it was found that aldehyde and hydroxy groups had key roles towards functionality. The aldehyde groups were related to anti-fungal activity and the hydroxy groups were related to potency. It was also found that both these derivatives were present among human cancer cell lines, specifically inhibitors of the cell line. Research Xu and his team determined that when looking specifically at the cell line, both fellutamide C and D inhibited the growth of prostate carcinoma cells, PC-3. It carried out this inhibition through producing a block in the cell cycle leading to apoptosis or "cell death". They were unable to inhibit the growth of cancer cells found in the lungs.

== Fellutamide E and fellutamide F ==
During the same time that researcher Xu discovered the derivatives of fellutamide C from the soil Metulocladosporiella, a linear lipopeptide was found in Aspergillus versicolor. Aspergillus versicolor is a fungus that is derived from a marine sponge called Petrosia sp. Due to being discovered at the same time as Xu's discovery, the derivative was given the letter E instead. Recently fellutamide F was discovered as a cytotoxic lipopeptide. It was isolated through a mechanism called bioactivity-guided fractionation from a sponge derived fungus called A. versicolor. Fellutamide F has shown to be cytotoxic against human skin cancer cells (SK-MEL-2), CNS cancer (XF498), and colon cancer cells (HCT15). This mechanism is identical to cytotoxic potency of fellutamide C.

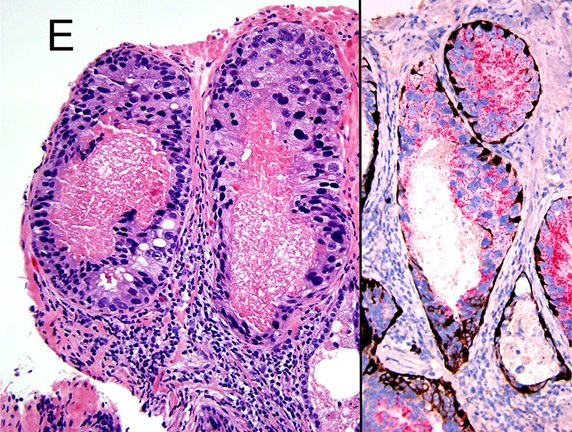
Prostate carcinoma cells

== Other research ==
Studies have shown that due to fellutamide B's structure of being a lipopeptide aldehyde, it can be utilized in the stimulation of neutrotrophins. It is reported that fellutamide B is one of the first compounds reported to have the potential of inducing neurotrophin activity, specifically through binding of the 20s proteasome. This is based on the intermediates formed for fellutamide B in its synthetic pathway. Rodent and Zebra-fish models have illustrated that the specific intermediates from fellutamide B highlight the potential for intermediates to be developed as treatments for psychiatric disorders. For example, the Zebra-fish model included two studies which were: Novel Tank Test (NTT) and Social Interaction Test (SIT) to look whether intermediates of fellutamide B could have psychological impacts in regards to stimulating neutrotrophins. Overall studies indicated that the intermediates have neurotrophic and mood benefiting effects. When looking specifically at fellutamide B, it is viewed as an "indirect neurotrophin" and stated to have easier Central Nervous System access. Fellutamide B is viewed as an "indirect neurotrophin" and is considered in adjacent to an adrenergic agonist. Fellutamide B is able to up-regulate Nerve Growth factors and that's causes researchers to look towards application towards targeting symptoms of neurodegenerative diseases.

Other research is looking into fungal genome projects which indicate cryptic secondary metabolism (SM) gene clusters. The research is specifically focused on expressing this clusters through sequentially replacing the promotor region of the genes. Through this mechanism it was shown that the products that was formed was the proteasome inhibitor specifically fellutamide B. The researchers study specifically stated that the inpE gene found on Aspergillus nidulans codes for a proteasome inhibitor and the genes presence is required for fellutamide B to be produced.
