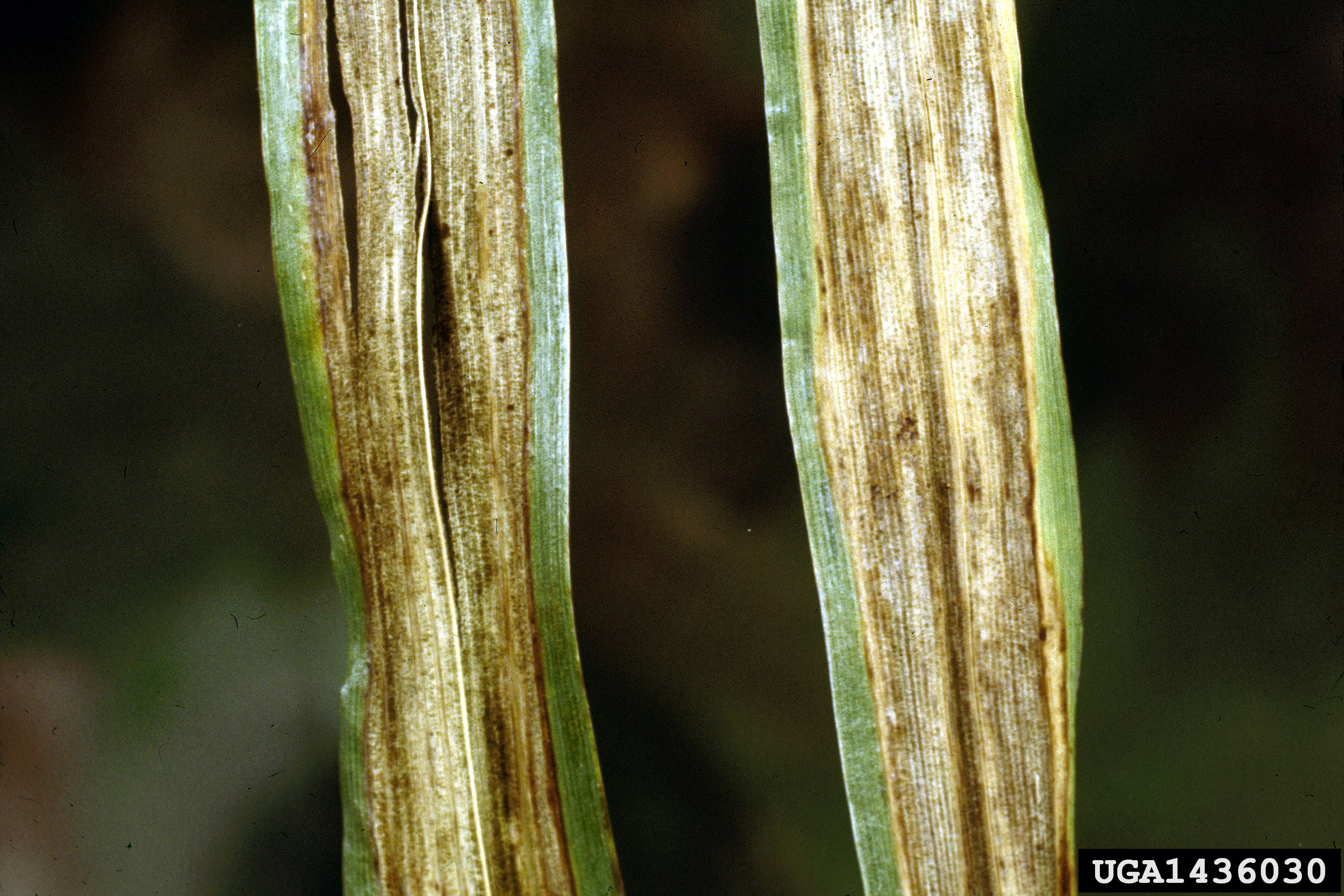
- P. graminea on Hordeum vulgare

Scientific classification
- Kingdom: Fungi
- Division: Ascomycota
- Class: Dothideomycetes
- Order: Pleosporales
- Family: Pleosporaceae
- Genus: Pyrenophora
- Species: P. graminea

Binomial name
- Pyrenophora graminea S.Ito & Kurib. 1931

Synonyms
- Brachysporium gracile var. gramineum (Rabenh.) Sacc. Drechslera graminea (Rabenh. ex Schltdl.); Drechslera teres subsp. graminea (Rabenh. ex Schltdl.); Helminthosporium gramineum Rabenh. ex Schltdl; Napicladium hordei Rostr. Pleospora graminea Died. Pyrenophora teres subsp. graminea (S. Ito & Kurib.); Pyrenophora graminea S. Ito & Kurib.

= Pyrenophora graminea =

Species of fungus

Pyrenophora graminea is the causal agent of barley stripe. Barley stripe is disease of barley that once caused significant crop yield losses in many areas of the world. Its associated anamorph is Drechslera graminea (Rabenhorst ex Schlechtendal) S. Ito 1930.

== Identification ==
Asexual stage: Pycnidia are rarely observed in nature. They are 70–176 μm in diameter, globose to pear-shaped, and develop superficially or partly submerged. The wall is thin and fragile and is yellow to brown, with a short ostiole. Pycnidiospores are 1.4–3.2 x 1.0–1.6 μm, spherical or ellipsoidal, hyaline, and nonseptate.

Sexual stage: Perithecia are rare in nature, they occur in barley straw in the autumn. The perithecia are 576–728 x 442–572 μm. They are superficial to partly submerged and are elongate, with rigid setae on the surface. Asci are club-shaped or cylindrical, clearly bitunicate, and rounded at the apex, with a short stalk at the base. Ascospores are 43–61 x 16–28 μm, light yellow-brown, ellipsoidal, and rounded at both ends, with transverse septa and one, occasionally two, septum in the median cells but never in the terminal cells.

Conidia are borne laterally and terminally on conidiophores, which usually occur in clusters of three to five. The conidia are straight with rounded ends and measure 11–24 x 30–100 μm. They are subhyaline to yellow-brown and have up to seven transverse septa.

In culture, mycelium is gray to olivaceous and is often sterile. Conidia may be formed when infected barley pieces as placed on water agar and incubated under diurnal light conditions followed by a period of chilling.

== Disease symptoms ==
Severe seedling infection can cause stunting and post-emergence death, but symptoms are not usually apparent until later, when long, chlorotic or yellow stripes on leaves and sheaths appear. Most leaves of a diseased plant are usually affected. Dark brown streaks develop later in the stripes, which eventually dry out and cause leaf shedding. Ears may not emerge or be deformed and discoloured. Grain production by infected plants is severely restricted.

== Geographical distribution ==
It is widespread and occurs in most barley-growing areas of the world.

== Physiological specialization ==
Considerable variation in pathogenicity between isolates exists, but no formal physiologic races have been recognized.

== Biology ==
The disease is mono-cyclic and seed-borne usually by mycelium in the pericarp. Perithecia are uncommon, but over-wintering sclerotia on crop debris have been reported from Russia. Secondary infection by conidia is apparently important only for floral infection and subsequent seed contamination.

== Sources ==
- Index Fungorum
- USDA ARS Fungal Database
