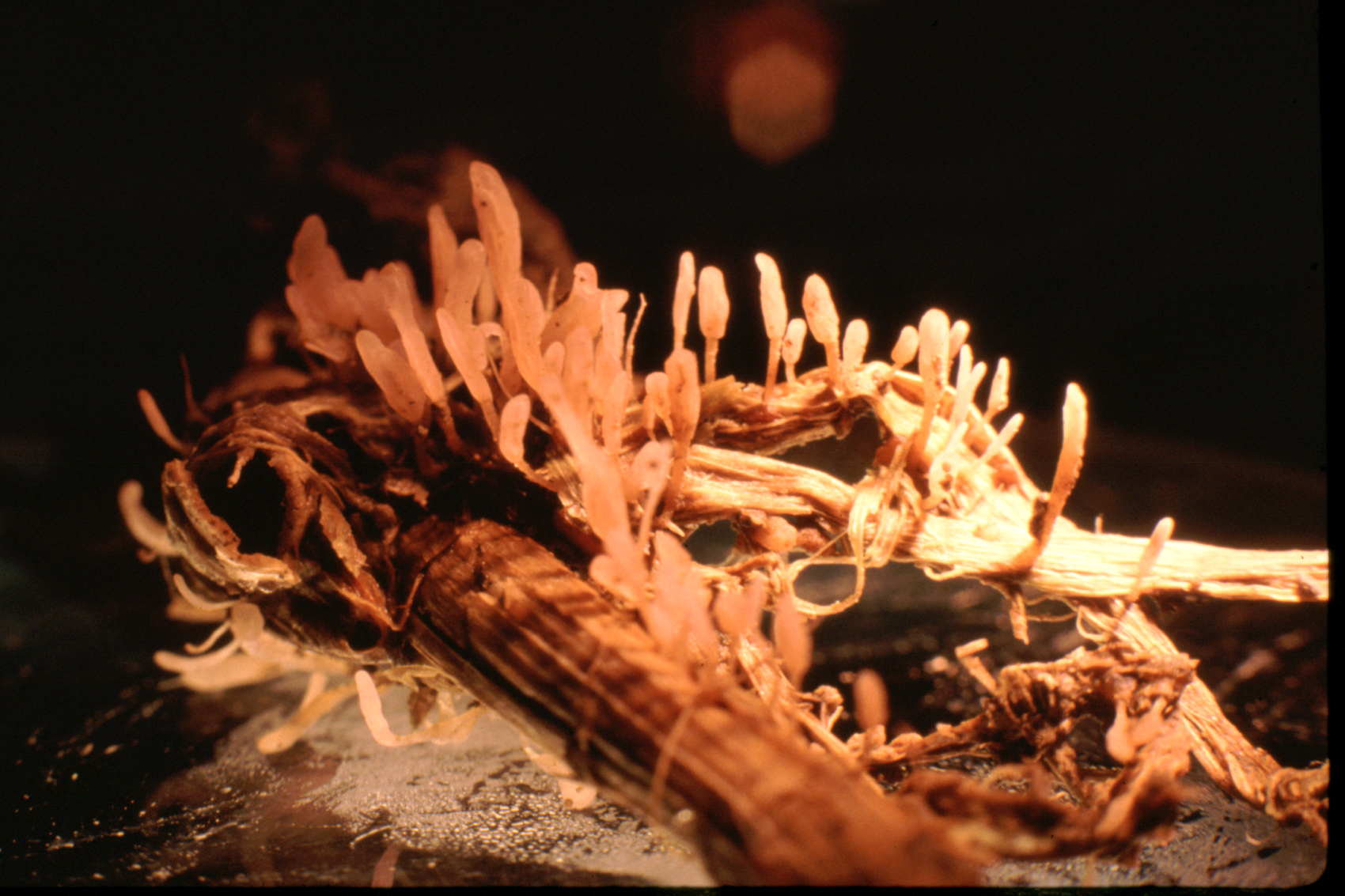
- Clavules

Scientific classification
- Domain: Eukaryota
- Kingdom: Fungi
- Division: Basidiomycota
- Class: Agaricomycetes
- Order: Agaricales
- Family: Typhulaceae
- Genus: Typhula
- Species: T. incarnata

Binomial name
- Typhula incarnata Lasch, Epicr. (1838)

Synonyms
- Clavaria elegantula P. Karst., (1882); Sclerotium fulvum Fr., (1822); Typhula itoana S. Imai, (1930)

= Typhula incarnata =

Species of fungus

Typhula incarnata is a fungal plant pathogen in the family Typhulaceae.

== Hosts and symptoms ==
Typhula incarnata is, along with Typhula ishikariensis, the causal agent of gray snow mold (also known as speckled snow mold or Typhula blight). This plant pathogen destroys cool season turfgrasses grown in areas with extended periods of snowcover. “Turfgrass hosts include but are not limited to: annual bluegrass, colonial bentgrass, creeping bentgrass, fine-leaf fescues, Kentucky bluegrass, perennial ryegrass, and tall fescue”. Signs of the pathogen can be observed in the spring as circular grayish-brown patches, about 15 cm in diameter, of mycelium. T. incarnata can be distinguished from T. ishkikariensis by its sclerotia. T. incarnata has reddish-brown sclerotia with a diameter of 1.5–3 mm, whereas T. iskikariensis has black sclerotia with a diameter of 0.5-1.5 mm.

== Disease cycle ==
The cool (-1-13 °C) and damp conditions of the fall allow Typhula incarnata to begin producing sclerotia. Young sclerotia of T. incarnata start out whitish-pink in color and eventually mature into hard reddish-brown spheres about 5 mm in diameter. Mature sclerotia will produce spore-bearing structures known as clavula, where basidia and basidiospores can form. During the winter, the sclerotia begin to germinate and produce mycelium under a snow cover. The mycelium eventually spreads, produces infection cushions, and penetrates plant tissue. In order for there to be a severe disease outbreak there must be a persistent snow cover, however there have been a few instances where an outbreak has occurred with little to no snow. In the spring, when the snow melts sclerotia and gray mycelia can be seen on dead plant tissue. As the plant tissue begins to decompose sclerotia drop to the ground where they oversummer. Throughout the summer, fungi tend to infest the sclerotia of T. incarnata, reducing germination rates up to 90%.

== Environment ==
Typhula incarnata develops when a prolonged snow cover (around 60 days) sits on an unfrozen ground where soil temperatures are above freezing (-1˗ 4.4 °C). T. incarnata typically doesn’t develop if the ground freezes before snow accumulates.

Snow molds are opportunistic pathogens meaning they only become pathogenic when host immunity is low. During the winter, plants usually have little resistance to disease because their carbohydrate reserves are low. This weakened immune response, along with little competition from other microorganisms, gives snow molds the perfect opportunity to infect their host.

Cold tolerance is one of the most important feature of snow molds. T. incarnata, and other species of gray snow molds, survive the winter by producing extracellular antifreeze proteins. These antifreeze proteins cause thermal hysteria. Thermal hysteria is the supply of heat to a material at a rate different from equilibrium. Antifreeze proteins bind to ice crystals and create curved ice fronts which are energetically unfavorable for the further absorption of water. This causes ice crystals not to form.

== Management ==
Turf infected by Typhula incarnata will typically recover when growth resumes in the spring. This is because T. incarnata doesn’t kill the crowns of grass. In order to avoid T. incarnata try planting species that aren’t susceptible (e.g., fine fescues). Also, avoid applying high nitrogen fertilizers late into the fall. High levels of nitrogen can promote late-season growth which encourages the disease. Finally, try mowing throughout the fall. This can help “prevent excessive turf top growth that is more easily infected by Typhula”.

Fungicides aren’t typically used to treat T. incarnata because the grass can usually recover naturally in the spring. Fungicides should only be used to prevent severe snow mold damage. They should be applied right before a snow cover is permanent or when snow begins to melt. Mixtures of fungicides, such as a demethylase inhibitor (DMI) with a chlorothalonil product or thiophanate-methyl product, can also be very effective at preventing snow mold damage.

== Importance ==
Typhula incarnata is common in Wisconsin and other areas of the Midwest. This disease can lead to reduced turf quality long into the summer months. Around $20,000 are spent each year on fungicides to prevent snow molds. Despite the large amount of money used to prevent this disease, many times T. incarnata, and other species of snow molds, will develop, especially after harsh or variable winter conditions.
