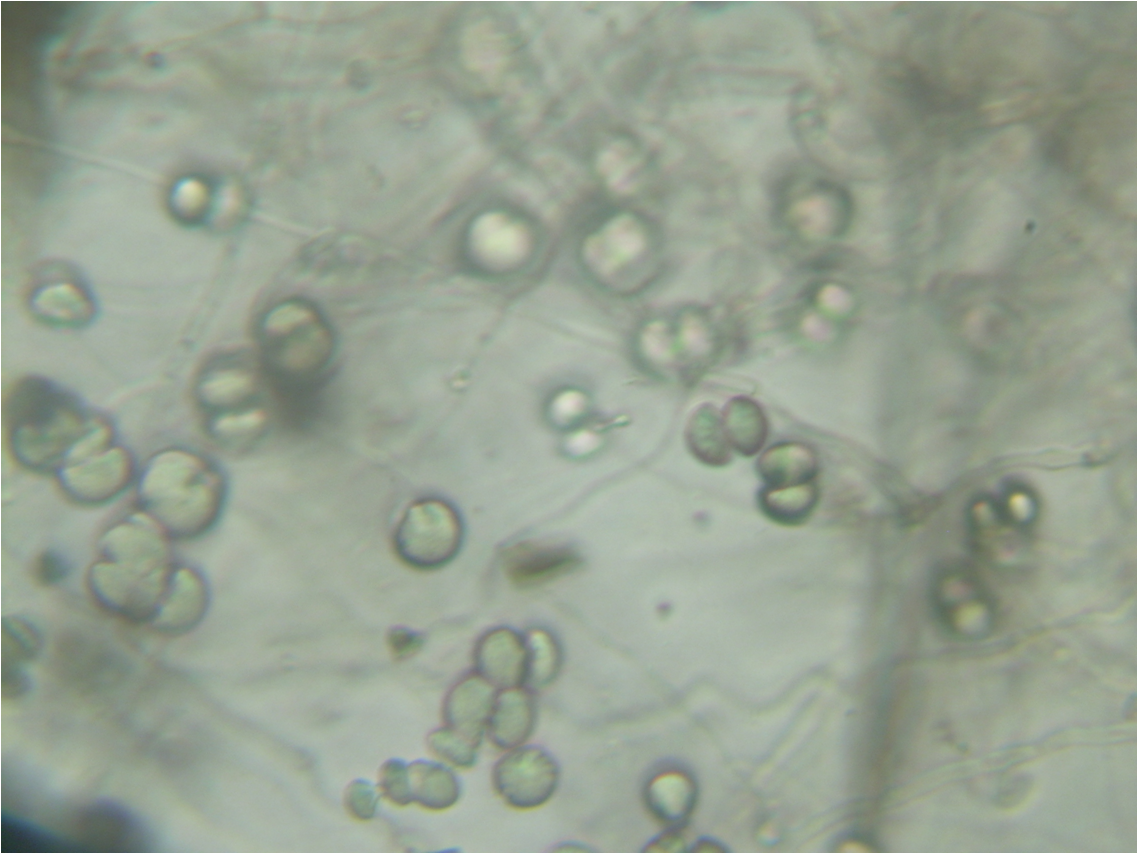
- Pyrenophora seminiperda spores

Scientific classification
- Kingdom: Fungi
- Division: Ascomycota
- Class: Dothideomycetes
- Order: Pleosporales
- Family: Pleosporaceae
- Genus: Pyrenophora
- Species: P. seminiperda

Binomial name
- Pyrenophora seminiperda (Brittleb. & D.B. Adam) Shoemaker, (1966)

= Pyrenophora seminiperda =

Species of fungus

Pyrenophora seminiperda is a minor plant pathogen that causes leaf spots on many grasses. It is an important generalist grass seed pathogen which causes visible cylindrical masses of black fungal hyphae (stromata) to grow from infected seeds. Hence the common name "black fingers of death"

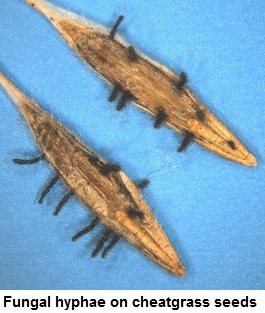
Pyrenophora seminiperda on Bromus tectorum seeds

It has been hypothesized that the fungus arrived in North America with invasive grasses from Eurasia. BFOD has been suggested as a method of biocontrol of the invasive cheatgrass, one of the most important invasive species in the USA. Various secondary metabolites of the fungus, including Cytochalasin B, Pyrenophoric Acid-B, and Spirostaphylotrichin W, appears to be responsible for the seed killing.
