= Aspergillomarasmine A =

Names
- IUPAC name (2S)-2-[[(2R)-2-[[(2R)-2-amino-2-carboxyethyl]amino]-2-carboxyethyl]amino]butanedioic acid
- Other names Toxin C

Identifiers
CAS Number	3484-65-9
3D model (JSmol)	Interactive image
ChEMBL	ChEMBL4087144
ChemSpider	170641
PubChem CID	197028
UNII	K4F9BJQ6EG
CompTox Dashboard (EPA)	DTXSID60956312
- InChI: InChI=1S/C10H17N3O8/c11-4(8(16)17)2-12-6(10(20)21)3-13-5(9(18)19)1-7(14)15/h4-6,12-13H,1-3,11H2,(H,14,15)(H,16,17)(H,18,19)(H,20,21)/t4-,5+,6-/m1/s1 Key: XFTWUNOVBCHBJR-NGJCXOISSA-N
- SMILES: C([C@@H](C(=O)O)NC[C@H](C(=O)O)NC[C@H](C(=O)O)N)C(=O)O

Properties
Chemical formula	C_{10}H_{17}N_{3}O_{8}
Molar mass	307.259 g·mol^{−1}
- Except where otherwise noted, data are given for materials in their standard state (at 25 °C [77 °F], 100 kPa). Infobox references

Aspergillomarasmine A is a polyamino acid naturally produced by the mold Aspergillus versicolor. The substance has been reported to inhibit two antibiotic resistance carbapenemase proteins in bacteria, New Delhi metallo-beta-lactamase 1 (NDM-1) and Verona integron-encoded metallo-beta-lactamase (VIM-2), and make those antibiotic-resistant bacteria susceptible to antibiotics. Aspergillomarasmine A is toxic to leaves of barley and other plants, being termed as "Toxin C" when produced by Pyrenophora teres.

The molecule is a tetracarboxylic acid with four -COOH groups. One section of the molecule is the amino acid aspartic acid. This has two alanine molecules attached by substituting a hydrogen on the methyl group with a link to the amine group. Aspergillomarasmine B differs in that the last alanine is replaced by glycine.

The crystalline substance was first isolated in 1956, but its name was given until 1965.

In addition to Aspergillus versicolor, aspergillomarasmine A is also produced by the ascomycete Pyrenophora teres where it acts as a toxin in the barley net-spot blotch disease. In P. teres, a biosynthetic precursor of aspergillomarasmine A, L,L-N-(2-amino-2-carboxyethyl)-aspartic acid has also been isolated and found to contribute to the phytotoxic properties of this microbe. This precursor, aspergillomarasmine A itself, and a lactam form (anhydroaspergillomarasmine A) are together termed the marasmines.

Other producers of aspergillomarasmine A include Aspergillus flavus, Aspergillus oryzae, Colletotrichum gloeosporioides, and Fusarium oxysporum.

In mice, the LD_{50} toxic dose of aspergillomarasmine A is 159.8 mg/kg.

== Properties ==
Aspergillomarasmine A takes the form of colorless crystals. The chemical is insoluble in common organic solvents, but can dissolve in water under either basic or strongly acidic conditions.

Anhydroaspergillomarasmine A, a lactam of aspergillomarasmine A, chemically called [1-(2-amino-2carboxyethyl)-6-carboxy-3-carboxymethyl-3-piperazinone], can also be found in Pyrenophora teres. The relative amount of these two toxins is dependent upon the pH of the growth medium, with lower pH favoring the lactam form. The lactam can be hydrolyzed to aspergillomarasmine A by treating it with trifluoroacetic acid.

Aspergillomarasmine A functions as a chelating agent, sequestering Fe^{3+} ions. It can inhibit endothelin converting enzymes even in the live rat, probably by chelating metals required by metalloproteases.

When heated, aspergillomarasmine A decomposes between 225° and 236 °C. Hydrolysis produces L-aspartic acid and racemic 2,3-diaminopropionic acid. Even though the precursor component is chiral, 2,3-diaminopropionic acid easily racemizes in acid.

Aspergillomarasmine A has [α]^{20°}_{D} at pH 7 of -48°.

With nitrous acid aspergillomarasmine A is deaminated, and isoserine with aspartic acid is formed.

Titration reveals changes in ionisation at pK 3.5 and 4.5 due to carboxylic acid groups, and pK 9.5 and 10 due to amino groups.

Treatment with ninhydrin produces a purple color.
