= Phaeosphaeria avenaria f.sp. avenaria =

Scientific classification
- Kingdom: Fungi
- Division: Ascomycota
- Class: Dothideomycetes
- Order: Pleosporales
- Family: Phaeosphaeriaceae
- Genus: Phaeosphaeria
- Species: Phaeosphaeria avenaria

Trinomial name
- Phaeosphaeria avenaria f.sp. avenaria O.E. Erikss. (1967)

Synonyms
- Hendersonia avenae (A.B. Frank) Petr., (1947); Leptosphaeria avenaria f.sp. avenae D.E. Shaw; Leptosphaeria avenaria f.sp. avenaria Weber, (1922); Phaeosphaeria avenaria (G.F. Weber) O.E. Erikss., (1967); Septoria avenae A.B. Frank, (1895); Stagonospora avenae (A.B. Frank) Bissett [as avena], (1982)

Fungal plant pathogen

Phaeosphaeria avenaria f.sp. avenaria is a plant pathogen affecting oat. This f. sp. appears to not infect barley or rye, while their f. sp. (tritici) does not appear to infect oat.

== See also ==
- List of oat diseases
