= Pyrenophora teres =

Scientific classification
- Kingdom: Fungi
- Division: Ascomycota
- Class: Dothideomycetes
- Order: Pleosporales
- Family: Pleosporaceae
- Genus: Pyrenophora
- Species: P. teres

Binomial name
- Pyrenophora teres Drechs. (1923)

Synonyms
- Drechslera teres (Sacc.) Shoemaker, Can. J. Bot. 37(5): 881 (1959); Drechslera teres f. maculata Smed.-Pet., Arb. Tiflis Bot. Gard.: 139 (1971); Helminthosporium hordei Eidam, Der Landw. (Schles. Landw. Ztg), Breslau 27: 509 (1891); Helminthosporium teres Sacc., Syll. fung. (Abellini) 4: 412 (1886); Pyrenophora teres f. maculata Smed.-Pet., The Royal Veterinary and Agricultural University Yearbook: 139 (1971)

Species of fungus

Pyrenophora teres is a necrotrophic fungal pathogen of some plant species, the most significant of which are economically important agricultural crops such as barley. Toxins include aspergillomarasmine A and related compounds.

== Host & symptoms ==
Pyrenophora teres is a plant pathogen that causes net blotch on barley (Hordeum vulgare). It is a disease that is distributed worldwide, and can be found in all regions where barley is grown. Two economically significant forms of the pathogen exist, P. teres f. teres and P. teres f. maculata, which give rise to net form of net blotch and spot form of net blotch, respectively. The distinction comes not from morphology, which is essentially the same in each, but rather by the differing manifestation of symptoms upon the infection of a host. Both forms induce chlorosis and necrosis, but the presentation of these symptoms, especially the shape and spread of necrotic lesions, is how they are distinguished.

The symptoms of both forms of P. teres are similar in that they begin with pin-sized brown necrotic spots on the lamia and sheath of the leaves (the most common infection court), and sometimes on the flowers and grains. Over time, these lesions increase in size, eventually diverging in shape. The legions caused by P. teres f. teres, causal agent of the net form of net blotch, elongate and move laterally across the leaf surface, forming characteristic dark-brown streaks that merge in order to create the net-like pattern for which the form is named. These lesions continue to extend as they age, the margins of which are often surrounded by a chlorotic halo.

Barley plants infected by P. teres f. maculata, causal agent of the spot form of net blotch, do not exhibit net-like patterns of necrosis. Instead, the initial pin-point dots grow in both height and width, forming larger circular or elliptical spots, generally 3–6 mm in diameter. As these spots increase in size, they become surrounded by a chlorotic zone which tends to vary in width. In severe cases, these necrotic and chlorotic zones can extend to such a width that they combine and destroy the entire leaf. With spot form of net blotch, symptoms have been observed to appear on a continuum based upon the strength of the resistance of the variety: those that are completely resistant have lesions that do not grow past the initial pin-point size; as the resistance decreases, the size of the lesions increase. The biological basis of this difference originates from the way in which each form infects; P. teres f. maculata grows more slowly and thus the necrosis remains relatively localized at initial infection zone, whereas P. teres f. teres grows more quickly and extensively at the sub-epidermal level, extending the necrosis further from the initial infection zone.

== Disease cycle ==
Although the symptoms they present are distinct, P. teres f. teres and P. teres f. maculata have essentially the same life cycle, the only difference being the absence of seed dispersal stage in the latter, so the spot form of the disease is unable to overwinter in barley seed. Pseudothecia that overwinter on infected barley stubble and act as the primary inoculum. These appear as dark, 1–2 mm spherical structures with septate setae on the surface of plant debris, which, during cool and moist conditions, mature and produce ascospores that are dispersed by wind and rain, thereby colonizing the leaves of new barley hosts. While healthier leaves have been observed to be more quickly infected than older ones, P. teres has been shown to infect barley at any growth stage. Germination of the ascospores can occur in as little as a few hours, during which an appressorium with a penetration peg develops to perforate the cell wall, forming an “intracellular infection vesicle”. While the penetration most often occurs in epidermal cells, P. teres has also been shown to penetrate between epidermal cells and, more rarely, through stomata. Within 24 hours, pin-sized brown lesions occur at the initial infection site, which extend as the fungus matures.

The fungus grows and populates the host tissue, and after 14–20 days conidia are formed. The conidia are dispersed through wind and rain, and act as the secondary inoculum, creating a polycyclic disease cycle. Once a host is found, the conidia germinate and form germ tubes with a club-shaped appressorium that penetrates the cell wall and initiates a new infection. These conidia have the ability to infect plants in both the site in which they are formed, as well as neighboring fields if they travel far enough.

The severity of the pathogen's spread relies heavily upon certain environmental factors, as the conidia require specific temperature (10-25 degrees Celsius), relative humidity (95-100%), and leaf wetness for dispersal and germination. As long as the environmental conditions are suitable many secondary disease cycles can occur, resulting in potentially devastating infection rates if the cultivated barley is of a susceptible variety. Pseudothecia are formed by mycelia in necrotic tissue at the end of the season in order to facilitate overseason survival and the re-initiation of the disease cycle when conditions are once again favorable.

In P. teres f. teres, seed-borne mycelium can also act as the primary inoculum; however, this is much less common than is the infection from pathogenic pseudothecia overwintered in barley stubble. In the same vein, volunteer barley plants and those closely related to barley, such as barley grass, wheat, and oat, can be infected through mycelia or conidia and become an inoculum source: the extent to which this affects the spread of the disease is unknown. Plant debris, however, remains the primary source by which barley is infected.

== Disease management ==
Pyrenophora teres is most effectively controlled using a combination of cultural and chemical means, in addition to host resistance. An integrated approach is suggested due to the occurrence of frequent genetic recombination, which can quickly make some fungicides obsolete, and cause previously resistant barley cultivars in a region to succumb.

=== Host resistance ===
Cultivating resistant varieties is seen as the vanguard of combating P. teres, and it has the best effects on long-term disease management. By knowing what form of the pathogen is present in a specific region and growing cultivars that are resistant to that form, fungicide application can be greatly decreased or terminated. Decreased fungicide use has three positive effects: monetary input by the farmer is decreased because fewer fungicides are purchased and less labor is required to apply them, there is a lower possibility of chemical contamination of the environment, and the possibility of neighboring crops being infected is decreased. The presence of P. teres must be closely monitored, however: although generally only one form is dominant in a region, this dominance is not permanent, and forms have been known to essentially switch places over time for a variety of known and unknown reasons. If a cultivar that is only resistant to one form is grown and the other form appears and epidemic could possibly occur.

=== Cultural practices ===
Cultural management practices generally work to reduce the primary inoculum source (the pseudothecia) present in barley stubble through destruction the residual debris and through crop rotation. Crop rotation is beneficial, as P. teres primarily infects Hordeum vulgare. Similarly, the destruction of volunteer plants is suggested on sites where they may pose a problem. This often has a residual benefit of reducing possible infections from other pathogens that may also be on the volunteer plant, such as rust. Good crop nutrition to promote healthy plants that are more resistant to disease and delayed sowing can also be used to bolster the effects of other management practices, but these are not adequate enough to be used as the sole means of control.

=== Chemical control ===
In environments where host resistance and cultural practices are not sufficient to manage the pathogen, foliar fungicides can be applied. An effective strategy is to apply fungicide to only the top leaves at predetermined points in the plant's growing cycle, generally at flag leaf emergence, in order to target both the primary inoculum and, in that way, to minimize or eradicate the ability of the pathogen to produce a secondary inoculum. This protects both the main sites of photosynthesis (roughly the top four leaves) as well as the flag leaf and emerging ears, which provide the crop yield. According to one study, in which the disease was present in moderate severity, “pyraclostrobin, propiconazole and a mixture of propiconazole with iprodione were the most effective at controlling [the disease], as well as improving grain yield and quality”. Herbicides may also be used to eliminate volunteer plants that can act as a source of inoculum.

== Role of reactive oxygen species ==
During plant-fungal interactions involving Pyrenophora, resistant and susceptible varieties of barley display differential levels of reactive oxygen species production. This implicates ROS as having a central role in plant resistance, along with their regulators, known as ROS scavengers
