= Punctodera chalcoensis =

Scientific classification
- Kingdom: Animalia
- Phylum: Nematoda
- Class: Chromadorea
- Order: Rhabditida
- Family: Heteroderidae
- Genus: Punctodera
- Species: P. chalcoensis

Binomial name
- Punctodera chalcoensis Stone, Sosa Moss & Mulvey, 1976

Species of roundworm

Punctodera chalcoensis is a plant pathogenic nematode infecting oats.
