= Penicillium dierckxii =

Scientific classification
- Kingdom: Fungi
- Division: Ascomycota
- Class: Eurotiomycetes
- Order: Eurotiales
- Family: Aspergillaceae
- Genus: Penicillium
- Species: P. dierckxii

Binomial name
- Penicillium dierckxii Biourge, P. 1923

Type strain
- Biourge 12, CBS 185.81, CCF 2770, IHEM 5937, IMI 092216, LSHB P32, MUCL 28665, NRRL 755, Thom 4733.50

Synonyms
- Penicillium fellutanum, Penicillium pusillum, Penicillium decumbens var. atrovirens, Penicillium fellutanum var. nigrocastaneum, Penicillium atrovirens

Species of fungus

Penicillium dierckxii is a species of the genus of Penicillium which produces citreoviridin and citrinin.

== See also ==
- List of Penicillium species
