= Typhula blight =

Fungal disease of plants

- Causal agents: Typhula incarnata, Typhula ishikariensis

Typhula blight (commonly called gray snow mold or speckled snow mold) is most commonly known as a turf disease, but can also be a problem with wheat. Typhula blight is caused by a Typhula fungus, either Typhula incarnata or T. ishikariensis. Typhula incarnata is the causal agent for gray snow mold and T. ishikariensis causes speckled snow mold. Snow molds are caused by cold tolerant fungi that require snow cover or prolonged periods of cold, wet conditions. Typhula blight is most notably found in the turf industry, affecting a wide range of turfgrasses. Upon the snow melt, gray circular patches of mycelium are found. These mycelia produce a survival structure called a sclerotia that survives the warm summer months. Typhula blight is commonly controlled with fungicide applications in the late fall and by other cultural practices. If unchecked, snow molds can cause severe turf loss.

== Hosts and symptoms ==
Typhula blight is a major problem with cool season turfgrasses during winter months. These grasses include bentgrass, annual bluegrass, perennial ryegrass, fine fescue, and kentucky bluegrass. Typhula blight is also commonly referred to as gray snow mold due to the gray colored patches found after snow has melted. Gray snow mold affects all of its hosts in the same way. After the snow has melted, gray to grayish white patches of mycelium, six to twelve inches in diameter, can be found. Within the patches, diseased grass blades often reveal either rusty or reddish brown colored sclerotia up to five millimeters in diameter. Gray snow mold can cause thinning and possibly death of the infected host.

== Disease cycle ==
Unlike most plant pathogens, Typhula blight's dormant stage occurs in the warm conditions of the summer months as sclerotia, a hard survival structure. Upon favorable conditions of cold, wet weather, the sclerotia germinates grayish white spore-bearing bodies called basidiocarps to produce hyphae with clamp connections. The disease then infects the plant tissue and resumes the disease cycle. It is there where the pathogen produces sclerotia to survive the next summer months.

== Environment ==
Typhula blight is commonly found in United States in the Great Lakes region and anywhere where cold winter temperatures and snow fall persist. The disease is usually dependent on 60 days of snow cover and high nitrogen fertility where the ground has yet to freeze. Disease growth is also favored by excessive thatch, poor drainage, and high soil moisture. Typhula blight also prefers uncut or taller grass that has been matted down. This is because tall grass can provide an incubation chamber underneath the snow, promoting fungal growth of the snow mold.

== Management ==
Typhula blight and snow molds can be controlled by fungicide applications. However, the timing of the application is crucial. This chemical treatment needs to be done in late fall before the first snow fall. If the application is made too soon a second follow up treatment may be needed. Possible chemical applications include: a demethylation inhibitor, or DMI, with a chlorothalonil product, a DMI with a thiophanate-methyl product, or an Iprodione with a chlorothalonil product. Typhula blight can also be controlled culturally. One method would be to plant a less susceptible turfgrass. Bentgrass and annual bluegrass are the two most susceptible turfgrasses to Typhula blight. Another method is to limit heavy late season fertilizer applications. Finally, cutting the grass until dormancy to keep the grass height down can help.

== Importance ==
Typhula blight is a very common and damaging disease of the Great Lakes and Intermountain Northwest regions of the United States. Millions of dollars are spent each year to prevent this disease from occurring. Typhula blight, although serious and detrimental, with proper precautions can be avoided. For many homeowners, typhula blight will show up in the spring on their lawns. Because this disease does not always kill the grass, the lawn can green-up very quickly, avoiding a decline in aesthetics. However, for many golf courses, these brown patches early in the season are not tolerable. Although the turf may green-up eventually, in the turf industry where aesthetics are valued highly, typhula blight must be evaded.

== See also ==
- Phacidiaceae
- Snow mold
