= Clavula =

Clavula may refer to:

- Clavula, a synonym for a genus of sedges, Eleocharis
- Clavula, a synonym for a genus of hydrozoans, Turritopsis
- Clavula (fungal morphology)
