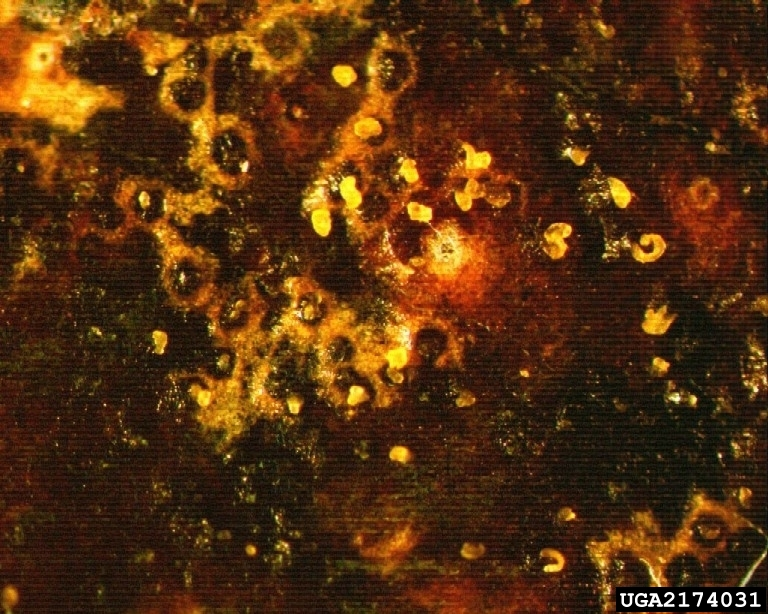

Scientific classification
- Kingdom: Fungi
- Division: Ascomycota
- Class: Dothideomycetes
- Order: Pleosporales
- Family: Pleosporaceae
- Genus: Drechslera
- Species: D. avenacea

Binomial name
- Drechslera avenacea (M.A. Curtis ex Cooke) Shoemaker, (1959)
- Helminthosporium avenaceum M.A. Curtis ex Cooke, (1889)

= Drechslera avenacea =

Pathogenic fungus

Drechslera avenacea is a fungal plant pathogen.

== Hosts ==
Hosts are Avena spp. Includes wild oats, for which it is a bioherbicide.

== Research ==
Ghajar et al., 2006 investigates and provides culturing parameters.
