= Albert Bernhard Frank =

German biologist and botanist (1839–1900)

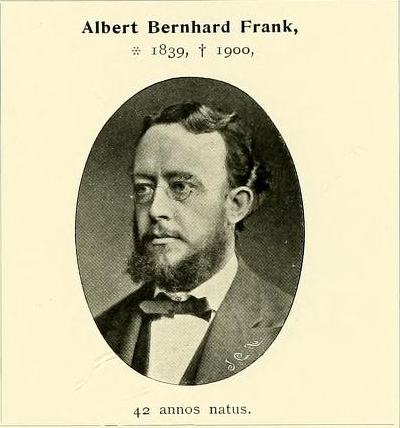
- Born: 17 January 1839; Dresden
- Died: 27 September 1900 (aged 61); Berlin
- Other name: A. B. Frank
- Occupations: botanist, plant pathologist, mycologist
- Known for: coining the term "mycorrhiza"

Albert Bernhard Frank (17 January 1839 – 27 September 1900) was a German botanist, plant pathologist, and mycologist, born in Dresden. He is credited with coining the term mycorrhiza in his 1885 paper "Über die auf Wurzelsymbiose beruhende Ernährung gewisser Bäume durch unterirdische Pilze".

Frank was commissioned to develop practical methods for truffle cultivation by the King of Prussia (Wilhelm I). Although this project was not successful, it led to his elucidation of the nature and development of mycorrhizae. The history and impacts of Frank's work on mycorrhizae were reviewed by Trappe.

The bacterial genus Frankia and family Frankiaceae were named after him.

In 1877, Albert Frank coined the term "symbiosis" (German: Symbiose) to describe the nature of lichens. He died in Berlin.

The standard author abbreviation A.B.Frank is used to indicate this person as the author when citing a botanical name.

== Works ==
- Pflanzen-Tabellen zur leichten, schnellen und sicheren Bestimmung der höheren Gewächse Nord-und Mittel-Deutschlands, nebst 2 besonderen Tabellen zur Bestimmung der deutschen Holzgewächse nach dem Laube, sowie im winterlichen Zustande und einer Uebersicht über das natürliche System . Schmidt & Günther, Leipzig 4., verb. und verm. Aufl. 1881 Digital edition by the University and State Library Düsseldorf
