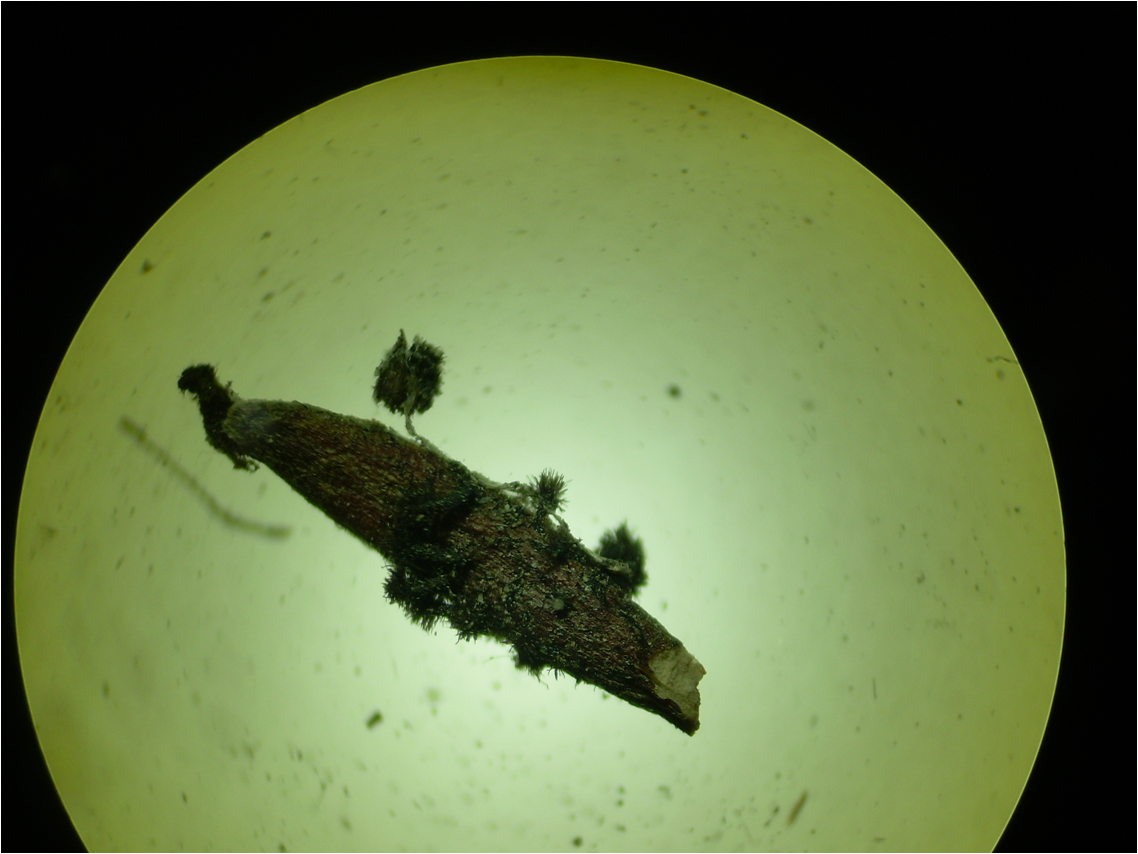
- Pyrenophora seminiperda on cheat grass (Bromus secalinus L.)

Scientific classification
- Domain: Eukaryota
- Kingdom: Fungi
- Division: Ascomycota
- Class: Dothideomycetes
- Order: Pleosporales
- Family: Pleosporaceae
- Genus: Pyrenophora; Fr.

Type species
- Pyrenophora phaeocomes (Rebent.) Fr.

Species
- See list

= Pyrenophora =

Genus of fungi

The fungal genus Pyrenophora includes 108 species, including the following plant pathogenic species: Pyrenophora teres, Pyrenophora graminea and Pyrenophora tritici-repentis.

Pyrenophora teres (has the teleomorph, Drechslera teres) makes up to 3 conidia per conidiophore. It infects plants with an appressorium. It grows bio-trophically in the first infected plant cell, but then switches to a necrotrophic growth mode. During necrotrophic growth, the fungus can only be found in the plant apoplast but not within plant cells.

== Species ==
As accepted by Species Fungorum (which has a list over 50 former species);

- Pyrenophora allosuri Cruchet (1923)
- Pyrenophora ampla Syd. & P. Syd. (1906)
- Pyrenophora astragalorum Maire (1906)
- Pyrenophora avenae S. Ito & Kurib. (1930)
- Pyrenophora avenicola Y. Marín & Crous (2019)
- Pyrenophora bartramiae Racov. (1959)
- Pyrenophora biseptata (Sacc. & Roum.) Crous (2013)
- Pyrenophora bondarzewii Pidopl. (1950)
- Pyrenophora brizae C. Massal. ex Sacc. (1911)
- Pyrenophora bromi (Died.) Drechsler (1923)
- Pyrenophora bryophila Racov. (1959)
- Pyrenophora buddlejae Gucevič (1959)
- Pyrenophora bupleuri Negru (1965)
- Pyrenophora calvertii Gucevič (1959)
- Pyrenophora carthami Politis (1940)
- Pyrenophora castillejae Earle (1901)
- Pyrenophora catenaria (Drechsler) Rossman & K.D. Hyde (2015)
- Pyrenophora centranthi Politis (1940)
- Pyrenophora cerastii (Oudem.) Lind (1924)
- Pyrenophora chaetomioides Speg. (1898)
- Pyrenophora chengii Gucevič (1960)
- Pyrenophora chrysanthemi Gucevič (1952)
- Pyrenophora ciliolata Moesz (1915)
- Pyrenophora clematidis Earle (1901)
- Pyrenophora convexispora Bubák (1914)
- Pyrenophora convolvuli Gucevič (1959)
- Pyrenophora coppeyana Maire (1930)
- Pyrenophora cynosuri Y. Marín & Crous (2019)
- Pyrenophora dactylidis Ammon (1963)
- Pyrenophora dematioidea (Bubák & Wróbl.) Rossman & K.D. Hyde (2015)
- Pyrenophora dichondrae Yun Huang & F. Fang (2008)
- Pyrenophora dictyoides A.R. Paul & Parbery (1968)
- Pyrenophora dubia Bubák (1914)
- Pyrenophora ephedrae Speg. (1912)
- Pyrenophora ephemera Crivelli (1983)
- Pyrenophora eriogoni Earle (1901)
- Pyrenophora eryngiicola Losa (1947)
- Pyrenophora erythrospila A.R. Paul (1972)
- Pyrenophora euphorbiae Politis (1946)
- Pyrenophora filicina Lind (1910)
- Pyrenophora flavofusca Feltgen (1903)
- Pyrenophora freticola Speg. (1924)
- Pyrenophora fugax (Wallr.) Rossman & K.D. Hyde (2015)
- Pyrenophora grahamii Rossman & K.D. Hyde (2015)
- Pyrenophora graminea S. Ito & Kurib. (1930)
- Pyrenophora heraclei Gucevič (1959)
- Pyrenophora hordei Wallwork, Lichon & Sivan. (1992)
- Pyrenophora hyperici Gucevič (1960)
- Pyrenophora japonica S. Ito & Kurib. (1930)
- Pyrenophora kugitangi Kurbans. (1982)
- Pyrenophora leucelenes Fairm. (1918)
- Pyrenophora leucospermi Crous & L. Swart (2011)
- Pyrenophora lithophila Gucevič (1959)
- Pyrenophora lolii Dovaston (1948)
- Pyrenophora macrospora Wehm. (1961)
- Pyrenophora meliloti Ranoj. (1919)
- Pyrenophora metasequoiae Gucevič (1960)
- Pyrenophora minuartiae-hirsutae Gucevič (1959)
- Pyrenophora moroczkovskii Gucevič (1959)
- Pyrenophora muscorum Racov. (1959)
- Pyrenophora nisikadoi Y. Marín & Crous (2019)
- Pyrenophora nobleae (McKenzie & D. Matthews) Rossman & K.D. Hyde (2015)
- Pyrenophora novozelandica Y. Marín & Crous (2019)
- Pyrenophora nuda Cooke (1879)
- Pyrenophora osmanthi Gucevič (1970)
- Pyrenophora pachyasca Syd. & P. Syd. (1908)
- Pyrenophora parvula (Speg.) Sacc. (1883)
- Pyrenophora pellatii Ranoj. (1918)
- Pyrenophora pellita (Fr.) Sacc. (1883)
- Pyrenophora pestalozzae Magnus (1903)
- Pyrenophora phaeocomes (Rebent.) Fr. (1849)
- Pyrenophora phlei (E. Müll.) Crivelli (1983)
- Pyrenophora pimpinellae Gucevič (1959)
- Pyrenophora pittospori Bondartseva (1960)
- Pyrenophora poae (Baudyš) Y. Marín & Crous (2019)
- Pyrenophora polyphragmoides Sacc. & Scalia (1904)
- Pyrenophora polytricha Sousa da Câmara (1936)
- Pyrenophora pontresinensis Kirschst. (1939)
- Pyrenophora pseudoerythrospila Y. Marín & Crous (2019)
- Pyrenophora pulsatillae Gucevič (1959)
- Pyrenophora raetica (E. Müll.) Crivelli (1983)
- Pyrenophora rayssiae Sandu (1961)
- Pyrenophora relicina (Fuckel) Sacc. (1883)
- Pyrenophora rugosa Dearn. & Bisby (1929)
- Pyrenophora saviczii Gucevič (1959)
- Pyrenophora scirpi (Fr. ex Rabenh.) Wehm. (1961)
- Pyrenophora seminiperda (Brittleb. & D.B. Adam) Shoemaker (1966)
- Pyrenophora semiusta Gucevič (1970)
- Pyrenophora seseli Gucevič (1959)
- Pyrenophora sieglingiae Y. Marín & Crous (2019)
- Pyrenophora silenes Gonz. Frag. (1916)
- Pyrenophora sobolewskii Gucevič (1959)
- Pyrenophora subantarctica Speg. (1924)
- Pyrenophora sudetica Baudyš & Picb. (1925)
- Pyrenophora syntrichiae Racov. (1959)
- Pyrenophora szaferiana Moesz (1926)
- Pyrenophora teres Drechsler (1923)
- Pyrenophora tetraneuris Earle (1905)
- Pyrenophora tetrarrhenae A.R. Paul (1971)
- Pyrenophora tranzschelii Gucevič (1959)
- Pyrenophora trifolii Savinceva (1970)
- Pyrenophora triseptata (Drechsler) Rossman & K.D. Hyde (2015)
- Pyrenophora tritici-repentis (Died.) Drechsler (1923)
- Pyrenophora ushuwaiensis Speg. (1924)
- Pyrenophora variabilis Hern.-Restr. & Y. Marín (2019)
- Pyrenophora venturia (Speg.) Sacc. (1883)
- Pyrenophora villosa Gucevič (1959)
- Pyrenophora wirreganensis (Wallwork, Lichon & Sivan.) Y. Marín & Crous (2019)
