= Leaf blotch =

Leaf blotch may refer to:

- Leaf blotch miner moth (Acrocercops brongniardella), a moth species found in Europe and North America
- Septoria leaf blotch - Zymoseptoria tritici/Mycosphaerella graminicola, a plant pathogen that is difficult to control due to resistance to multiple fungicides
