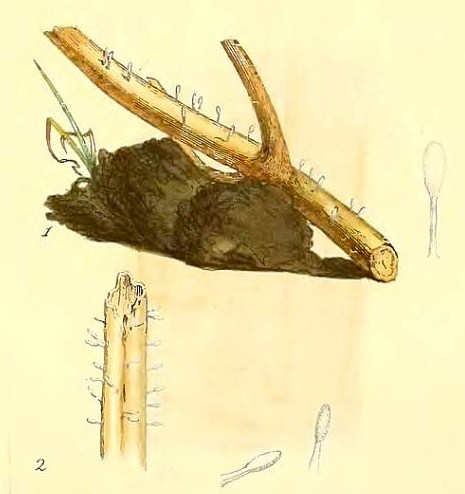
- Typhula quisquiliaris, as illustrated by James Sowerby

Scientific classification
- Domain: Eukaryota
- Kingdom: Fungi
- Division: Basidiomycota
- Class: Agaricomycetes
- Order: Agaricales
- Family: Typhulaceae
- Genus: Typhula (Pers.) Fr. (1818)

Type species
- Typhula incarnata (proposed) Lasch (1838)

Species
- Typhula erythropus; Typhula canadensis; Typhula ishikariensis; Typhula ishikariensis var. idahoensis; Typhula quisquiliaris; Typhula uncialis; Typhula variabilis

Synonyms
- Cnazonaria Corda; Dacryopsella Höhn. Gliocoryne Maire; Phacorhiza Pers. Pistillaria Fr. Pistillina Quél. Sphaerula Pat. Tygervalleyomyces Crous

= Typhula =

Genus of fungi

Typhula is a genus of clavarioid fungi in the order Agaricales. Species of Typhula are saprotrophic, mostly decomposing leaves, twigs, and herbaceous material. Basidiocarps (fruit bodies) are club-shaped or narrowly cylindrical and are simple (not branched), often arising from sclerotia. A few species are facultative plant pathogens, causing a number of commercially important crop and turfgrass diseases.

== Taxonomy ==
The genus was first introduced as a section of Clavaria by South African-born mycologist Christiaan Hendrik Persoon in 1801. He differentiated Typhula from Clavaria on the basis of fruitbody shape (Typhula having a distinct head and stem). The name was taken up at generic level by Elias Magnus Fries in 1818. Fries described four species in the genus. Subsequent authors described another 150 or so species in Typhula.

The genus was revised in 1950 by E. J. H. Corner, who characterized Typhula species as having fruit bodies arising from sclerotia, the genera Pistillaria and Pistillina accommodating similar species lacking sclerotia. A later and more specialist revision by Jacques Berthier (1976) placed both these latter genera in synonymy.

Molecular research, based on cladistic analysis of DNA sequences, indicates that the genus is monophyletic and forms a natural group. The type species, T. phacorrhiza, is not, however, closely related to other species in the genus and belongs in Macrotyphula. Rather than rename all other species currently referred to Typhula or Macrotyphula, a proposal is being made to change the type species of Typhula to T. incarnata.

== Description ==
Basidiocarps (fruit bodies) arise singly or severally from a sclerotium or directly from the substrate. Fruit bodies are filiform (hair-like) to club-shaped, typically with a distinct sterile stalk and fertile head, normally white, in some species buff to pink, or with a dark reddish stem. The sclerotia (when present) are spherical to lentil-shaped, hard and horny, yellow-brown to blackish brown. Microscopically, the hyphal system is monomitic, the hyphae with or without clamp connections. The basidia produce 2 to 4 basidiospores that are smooth (lobed in one species), colourless, and amyloid or inamyloid.

== Habitat and distribution ==
Typhula species mostly occur as saprotrophs on dead herbaceous stems, fern stems, grass stems, fallen leaves, and woody detritus. Some species occur on a wide range of host plants, others—such as Typhula quisquiliaris on bracken—appear to be host-specific. A few species are or can become facultative (opportunistic) parasites of crops and turfgrass.

Most species have been described from the north temperate zone, but little research has been undertaken in the tropics or southern hemisphere, where they are either less common or (as yet) overlooked.

== Economic importance ==
The psychrophilic species Typhula canadensis, Typhula ishikariensis, and Typhula incarnata are the causal agents of grey snow mould (also called speckled snow mould or typhula blight), a disease that can destroy turfgrass when covered for a long period with snow. It is a particular problem on golf courses established in unsuitable areas. More importantly, the same two species can also damage crops of winter wheat, as can the unrelated Macrotyphula phacorrhiza.
