= Pyrenophora chaetomioides =

Scientific classification
- Domain: Eukaryota
- Kingdom: Fungi
- Division: Ascomycota
- Class: Dothideomycetes
- Order: Pleosporales
- Family: Pleosporaceae
- Genus: Pyrenophora
- Species: P. chaetomioides

Binomial name
- Pyrenophora chaetomioides Speg. (1899)

Synonyms
- Drechslera avenae (Eidam) Scharif, (1963); Helminthosporium avenae (Briosi & Cavara) Ravn; Helminthosporium avenae Eidam, (1891); Helminthosporium avenae-sativae (Briosi & Cavara) J. Lindau; Helminthosporium teres var. avenae-sativae Briosi & Cavara

Species of fungus

Pyrenophora chaetomioides is a plant pathogen that affects oats.
