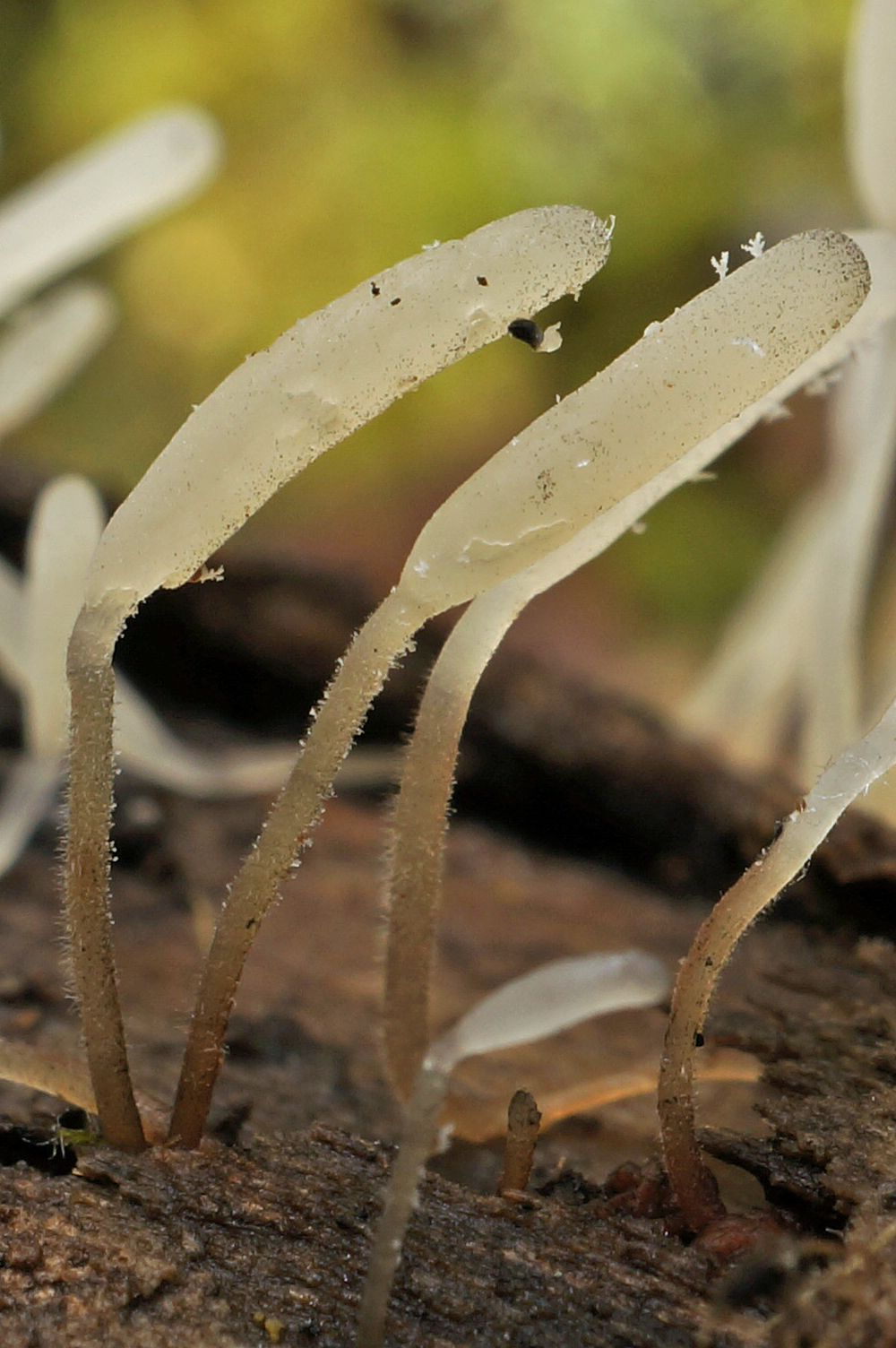
- Typhula sclerotioides

Scientific classification
- Kingdom: Fungi
- Division: Basidiomycota
- Class: Agaricomycetes
- Order: Agaricales
- Family: Typhulaceae; Jülich (1981)

Type genus
- Typhula (Pers.) Fr. (1818)

Genera
- Lutypha

= Typhulaceae =

Family of fungi

The Typhulaceae are a family of clavarioid fungi in the order Agaricales. Basidiocarps are small, simple, and typically club-shaped with a distinct stem. The family originally contained several genera, including Macrotyphula and Ceratellopsis, but molecular research, based on cladistic analysis of DNA sequences, has shown that only the type genus Typhula belongs in the Typhulaceae, the other genera being synonyms or belonging to other families. The monotypic Lutypha sclerotiophila has not yet been sequenced.

== See also ==
- List of Agaricales families
