= Mosaic virus =

Virus which causes a mottled appearance in infected plants' leaves

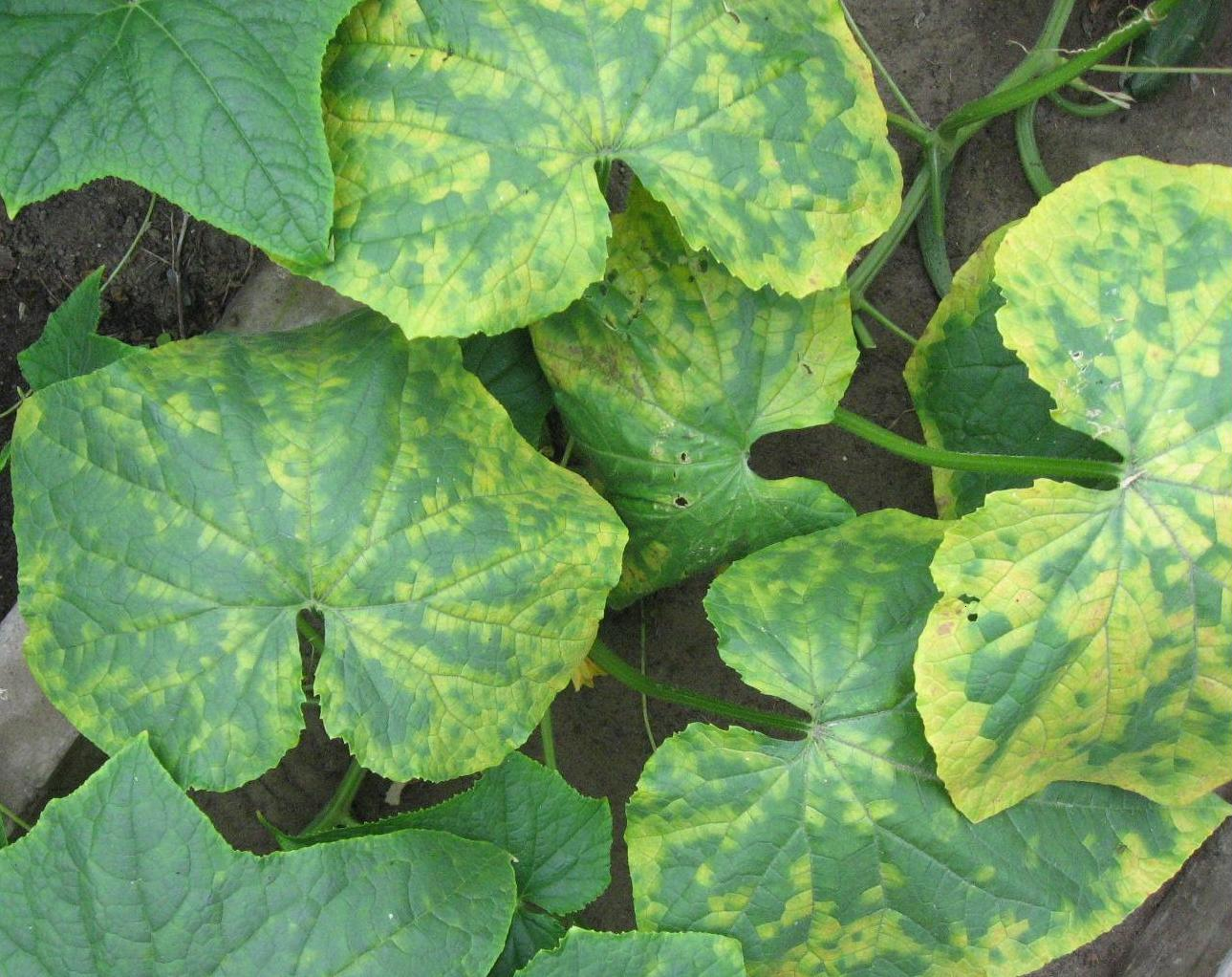
Cucumber leaves afflicted with various stages of Cucumber mosaic virus

A mosaic virus is any virus that causes infected plant foliage to have a mottled appearance. Such viruses come from a variety of unrelated lineages and consequently there is no taxon that unites all mosaic viruses.

== Examples ==
Virus species that contained the word 'mosaic' in their English language common name are listed below, though with the nomenclature and taxonomy of the ICTV 2022 release. However, not all viruses that may cause a mottled appearance belong to species that include the word "mosaic" in the name.

Species	Genus	Subfamily	Family	Order	Class	Subphylum	Phylum	Kingdom	Realm	Genome
vaccinii	Ophiovirus		Aspiviridae	Serpentovirales	Milneviricetes	Haploviricotina	Negarnaviricota	Orthornavirae	Riboviria	ssRNA(−)
tulipae	Ophiovirus		Aspiviridae	Serpentovirales	Milneviricetes	Haploviricotina	Negarnaviricota	Orthornavirae	Riboviria	ssRNA(−)
hypochaeris	Furovirus		Virgaviridae	Martellivirales	Alsuviricetes		Kitrinoviricota	Orthornavirae	Riboviria	ssRNA(+)
hordei	Cytorhabdovirus	Betarhabdovirinae	Rhabdoviridae	Mononegavirales	Monjiviricetes	Haploviricotina	Negarnaviricota	Orthornavirae	Riboviria	ssRNA(−)
gramineae	Cytorhabdovirus	Betarhabdovirinae	Rhabdoviridae	Mononegavirales	Monjiviricetes	Haploviricotina	Negarnaviricota	Orthornavirae	Riboviria	ssRNA(−)
tritici	Cytorhabdovirus	Betarhabdovirinae	Rhabdoviridae	Mononegavirales	Monjiviricetes	Haploviricotina	Negarnaviricota	Orthornavirae	Riboviria	ssRNA(−)
zeairanense	Alphanucleorhabdovirus	Betarhabdovirinae	Rhabdoviridae	Mononegavirales	Monjiviricetes	Haploviricotina	Negarnaviricota	Orthornavirae	Riboviria	ssRNA(−)
maydis	Alphanucleorhabdovirus	Betarhabdovirinae	Rhabdoviridae	Mononegavirales	Monjiviricetes	Haploviricotina	Negarnaviricota	Orthornavirae	Riboviria	ssRNA(−)
fici	Emaravirus		Fimoviridae	Bunyavirales	Ellioviricetes	Polyploviricotina	Negarnaviricota	Orthornavirae	Riboviria	ssRNA(−)
tritici	Emaravirus		Fimoviridae	Bunyavirales	Ellioviricetes	Polyploviricotina	Negarnaviricota	Orthornavirae	Riboviria	ssRNA(−)
cajani	Emaravirus		Fimoviridae	Bunyavirales	Ellioviricetes	Polyploviricotina	Negarnaviricota	Orthornavirae	Riboviria	ssRNA(−)
toordali	Emaravirus		Fimoviridae	Bunyavirales	Ellioviricetes	Polyploviricotina	Negarnaviricota	Orthornavirae	Riboviria	ssRNA(−)
phaseolinecrotessellati	Orthotospovirus		Tospoviridae	Bunyavirales	Ellioviricetes	Polyploviricotina	Negarnaviricota	Orthornavirae	Riboviria	ssRNA(+/−)
melotessellati	Orthotospovirus		Tospoviridae	Bunyavirales	Ellioviricetes	Polyploviricotina	Negarnaviricota	Orthornavirae	Riboviria	ssRNA(+/−)
rugomusivum	Comovirus	Comovirinae	Secoviridae	Picornavirales	Pisoniviricetes		Pisuviricota	Orthornavirae	Riboviria	ssRNA(+)
fabae	Comovirus	Comovirinae	Secoviridae	Picornavirales	Pisoniviricetes		Pisuviricota	Orthornavirae	Riboviria	ssRNA(+)
vignae	Comovirus	Comovirinae	Secoviridae	Picornavirales	Pisoniviricetes		Pisuviricota	Orthornavirae	Riboviria	ssRNA(+)
severum	Comovirus	Comovirinae	Secoviridae	Picornavirales	Pisoniviricetes		Pisuviricota	Orthornavirae	Riboviria	ssRNA(+)
glycinis	Comovirus	Comovirinae	Secoviridae	Picornavirales	Pisoniviricetes		Pisuviricota	Orthornavirae	Riboviria	ssRNA(+)
musivi	Comovirus	Comovirinae	Secoviridae	Picornavirales	Pisoniviricetes		Pisuviricota	Orthornavirae	Riboviria	ssRNA(+)
strophostylis	Comovirus	Comovirinae	Secoviridae	Picornavirales	Pisoniviricetes		Pisuviricota	Orthornavirae	Riboviria	ssRNA(+)
raphani	Comovirus	Comovirinae	Secoviridae	Picornavirales	Pisoniviricetes		Pisuviricota	Orthornavirae	Riboviria	ssRNA(+)
cucurbitae	Comovirus	Comovirinae	Secoviridae	Picornavirales	Pisoniviricetes		Pisuviricota	Orthornavirae	Riboviria	ssRNA(+)
cucurbitaceae	Fabavirus	Comovirinae	Secoviridae	Picornavirales	Pisoniviricetes		Pisuviricota	Orthornavirae	Riboviria	ssRNA(+)
gentianae	Fabavirus	Comovirinae	Secoviridae	Picornavirales	Pisoniviricetes		Pisuviricota	Orthornavirae	Riboviria	ssRNA(+)
lamii	Fabavirus	Comovirinae	Secoviridae	Picornavirales	Pisoniviricetes		Pisuviricota	Orthornavirae	Riboviria	ssRNA(+)
arabis	Nepovirus	Comovirinae	Secoviridae	Picornavirales	Pisoniviricetes		Pisuviricota	Orthornavirae	Riboviria	ssRNA(+)
chromusivum	Nepovirus	Comovirinae	Secoviridae	Picornavirales	Pisoniviricetes		Pisuviricota	Orthornavirae	Riboviria	ssRNA(+)
mori	Nepovirus	Comovirinae	Secoviridae	Picornavirales	Pisoniviricetes		Pisuviricota	Orthornavirae	Riboviria	ssRNA(+)
persicae	Nepovirus	Comovirinae	Secoviridae	Picornavirales	Pisoniviricetes		Pisuviricota	Orthornavirae	Riboviria	ssRNA(+)
taraxaci	Sequivirus		Secoviridae	Picornavirales	Pisoniviricetes		Pisuviricota	Orthornavirae	Riboviria	ssRNA(+)
dioscoreae, (Cholivirus subgenus)	Sadwavirus		Secoviridae	Picornavirales	Pisoniviricetes		Pisuviricota	Orthornavirae	Riboviria	ssRNA(+)
Alternanthera mosaic virus	Potexvirus		Alphaflexiviridae	Tymovirales					Riboviria	ssRNA(+)
Bamboo mosaic virus	Potexvirus		Alphaflexiviridae	Tymovirales					Riboviria	ssRNA(+)
Cassava common mosaic virus	Potexvirus		Alphaflexiviridae	Tymovirales					Riboviria	ssRNA(+)
Clover yellow mosaic virus	Potexvirus		Alphaflexiviridae	Tymovirales					Riboviria	ssRNA(+)
Cymbidium mosaic virus	Potexvirus		Alphaflexiviridae	Tymovirales					Riboviria	ssRNA(+)
Foxtail mosaic virus	Potexvirus		Alphaflexiviridae	Tymovirales					Riboviria	ssRNA(+)
Lagenaria mild mosaic virus	Potexvirus		Alphaflexiviridae	Tymovirales					Riboviria	ssRNA(+)
Malva mosaic virus	Potexvirus		Alphaflexiviridae	Tymovirales					Riboviria	ssRNA(+)
Narcissus mosaic virus	Potexvirus		Alphaflexiviridae	Tymovirales					Riboviria	ssRNA(+)
Papaya mosaic virus	Potexvirus		Alphaflexiviridae	Tymovirales					Riboviria	ssRNA(+)
Pepino mosaic virus	Potexvirus		Alphaflexiviridae	Tymovirales					Riboviria	ssRNA(+)
Plantago asiatica mosaic virus	Potexvirus		Alphaflexiviridae	Tymovirales					Riboviria	ssRNA(+)
Potato aucuba mosaic virus	Potexvirus		Alphaflexiviridae	Tymovirales					Riboviria	ssRNA(+)
Tamus red mosaic virus	Potexvirus		Alphaflexiviridae	Tymovirales					Riboviria	ssRNA(+)
White clover mosaic virus	Potexvirus		Alphaflexiviridae	Tymovirales					Riboviria	ssRNA(+)
Butterbur mosaic virus	Carlavirus	Quinvirinae	Betaflexiviridae	Tymovirales					Riboviria	ssRNA(+)
Helleborus mosaic virus	Carlavirus	Quinvirinae	Betaflexiviridae	Tymovirales					Riboviria	ssRNA(+)
Hop mosaic virus	Carlavirus	Quinvirinae	Betaflexiviridae	Tymovirales					Riboviria	ssRNA(+)
Poplar mosaic virus	Carlavirus	Quinvirinae	Betaflexiviridae	Tymovirales					Riboviria	ssRNA(+)
Red clover vein mosaic virus	Carlavirus	Quinvirinae	Betaflexiviridae	Tymovirales					Riboviria	ssRNA(+)
Banana mild mosaic virus		Quinvirinae	Betaflexiviridae	Tymovirales					Riboviria	ssRNA(+)
Sugarcane striate mosaic-associated virus		Quinvirinae	Betaflexiviridae	Tymovirales					Riboviria	ssRNA(+)
Peach mosaic virus	Trichovirus	Trivirinae	Betaflexiviridae	Tymovirales					Riboviria	ssRNA(+)
Grapevine asteroid mosaic associated virus	Marafivirus		Tymoviridae	Tymovirales					Riboviria	ssRNA(+)
Andean potato mild mosaic virus	Tymovirus		Tymoviridae	Tymovirales					Riboviria	ssRNA(+)
Cacao yellow mosaic virus	Tymovirus		Tymoviridae	Tymovirales					Riboviria	ssRNA(+)
Chayote mosaic virus	Tymovirus		Tymoviridae	Tymovirales					Riboviria	ssRNA(+)
Chiltepin yellow mosaic virus	Tymovirus		Tymoviridae	Tymovirales					Riboviria	ssRNA(+)
Eggplant mosaic virus	Tymovirus		Tymoviridae	Tymovirales					Riboviria	ssRNA(+)
Kennedya yellow mosaic virus	Tymovirus		Tymoviridae	Tymovirales					Riboviria	ssRNA(+)
Melon rugose mosaic virus	Tymovirus		Tymoviridae	Tymovirales					Riboviria	ssRNA(+)
Okra mosaic virus	Tymovirus		Tymoviridae	Tymovirales					Riboviria	ssRNA(+)
Ononis yellow mosaic virus	Tymovirus		Tymoviridae	Tymovirales					Riboviria	ssRNA(+)
Passion fruit yellow mosaic virus	Tymovirus		Tymoviridae	Tymovirales					Riboviria	ssRNA(+)
Peanut yellow mosaic virus	Tymovirus		Tymoviridae	Tymovirales					Riboviria	ssRNA(+)
Tomato blistering mosaic tymovirus	Tymovirus		Tymoviridae	Tymovirales					Riboviria	ssRNA(+)
Turnip yellow mosaic virus	Tymovirus		Tymoviridae	Tymovirales					Riboviria	ssRNA(+)
Voandzeia necrotic mosaic virus	Tymovirus		Tymoviridae	Tymovirales					Riboviria	ssRNA(+)
Wild cucumber mosaic virus	Tymovirus		Tymoviridae	Tymovirales					Riboviria	ssRNA(+)
Poinsettia mosaic virus			Tymoviridae	Tymovirales					Riboviria	ssRNA(+)
Peach latent mosaic viroid	Pelamoviroid		Avsunviroidae						Riboviria	ssRNA
Beet soil-borne mosaic virus	Benyvirus		Benyviridae						Riboviria	ssRNA(+)
Alfalfa mosaic virus	Alfamovirus		Bromoviridae						Riboviria	ssRNA(+)
Brome mosaic virus	Bromovirus		Bromoviridae						Riboviria	ssRNA(+)
Cucumber mosaic virus	Cucumovirus		Bromoviridae						Riboviria	ssRNA(+)
Apple mosaic virus	Ilarvirus		Bromoviridae						Riboviria	ssRNA(+)
Tulare apple mosaic virus	Ilarvirus		Bromoviridae						Riboviria	ssRNA(+)
Anthurium mosaic-associated chrysovirus	Alphachrysovirus		Chrysoviridae	Ghabrivirales	Chrymotiviricetes		Duplornaviricota		Riboviria	dsRNA
Megakepasma mosaic virus			Closteroviridae						Riboviria	ssRNA(+)
Pea enation mosaic virus 1	Enamovirus		Luteoviridae						Riboviria	ssRNA(+)
Maize yellow mosaic virus	Polerovirus		Luteoviridae						Riboviria	ssRNA(+)
Barley mild mosaic virus	Bymovirus		Potyviridae						Riboviria	ssRNA(+)
Barley yellow mosaic virus	Bymovirus		Potyviridae						Riboviria	ssRNA(+)
Oat mosaic virus	Bymovirus		Potyviridae						Riboviria	ssRNA(+)
Rice necrosis mosaic virus	Bymovirus		Potyviridae						Riboviria	ssRNA(+)
Wheat spindle streak mosaic virus	Bymovirus		Potyviridae						Riboviria	ssRNA(+)
Wheat yellow mosaic virus	Bymovirus		Potyviridae						Riboviria	ssRNA(+)
Alpinia mosaic virus	Macluravirus		Potyviridae						Riboviria	ssRNA(+)
Cardamom mosaic virus	Macluravirus		Potyviridae						Riboviria	ssRNA(+)
Chinese yam necrotic mosaic virus	Macluravirus		Potyviridae						Riboviria	ssRNA(+)
Maclura mosaic virus	Macluravirus		Potyviridae						Riboviria	ssRNA(+)
Yam chlorotic mosaic virus	Macluravirus		Potyviridae						Riboviria	ssRNA(+)
Sugarcane streak mosaic virus	Poacevirus		Potyviridae						Riboviria	ssRNA(+)
Triticum mosaic virus	Poacevirus		Potyviridae						Riboviria	ssRNA(+)
African eggplant mosaic virus	Potyvirus		Potyviridae						Riboviria	ssRNA(+)
Algerian watermelon mosaic virus	Potyvirus		Potyviridae						Riboviria	ssRNA(+)
Alstroemeria mosaic virus	Potyvirus		Potyviridae						Riboviria	ssRNA(+)
Alternanthera mild mosaic virus	Potyvirus		Potyviridae						Riboviria	ssRNA(+)
Amazon lily mosaic virus	Potyvirus		Potyviridae						Riboviria	ssRNA(+)
Araujia mosaic virus	Potyvirus		Potyviridae						Riboviria	ssRNA(+)
Banana bract mosaic virus	Potyvirus		Potyviridae						Riboviria	ssRNA(+)
Basella rugose mosaic virus	Potyvirus		Potyviridae						Riboviria	ssRNA(+)
Bean common mosaic necrosis virus	Potyvirus		Potyviridae						Riboviria	ssRNA(+)
Bean common mosaic virus	Potyvirus		Potyviridae						Riboviria	ssRNA(+)
Bean yellow mosaic virus	Potyvirus		Potyviridae						Riboviria	ssRNA(+)
Beet mosaic virus	Potyvirus		Potyviridae						Riboviria	ssRNA(+)
Bidens mosaic virus	Potyvirus		Potyviridae						Riboviria	ssRNA(+)
Brugmansia mosaic virus	Potyvirus		Potyviridae						Riboviria	ssRNA(+)
Butterfly flower mosaic virus	Potyvirus		Potyviridae						Riboviria	ssRNA(+)
Calanthe mild mosaic virus	Potyvirus		Potyviridae						Riboviria	ssRNA(+)
Catharanthus mosaic virus	Potyvirus		Potyviridae						Riboviria	ssRNA(+)
Celery mosaic virus	Potyvirus		Potyviridae						Riboviria	ssRNA(+)
Ceratobium mosaic virus	Potyvirus		Potyviridae						Riboviria	ssRNA(+)
Chinese artichoke mosaic virus	Potyvirus		Potyviridae						Riboviria	ssRNA(+)
Commelina mosaic virus	Potyvirus		Potyviridae						Riboviria	ssRNA(+)
Cowpea aphid-borne mosaic virus	Potyvirus		Potyviridae						Riboviria	ssRNA(+)
Daphne mosaic virus	Potyvirus		Potyviridae						Riboviria	ssRNA(+)
Dasheen mosaic virus	Potyvirus		Potyviridae						Riboviria	ssRNA(+)
Endive necrotic mosaic virus	Potyvirus		Potyviridae						Riboviria	ssRNA(+)
Freesia mosaic virus	Potyvirus		Potyviridae						Riboviria	ssRNA(+)
Gloriosa stripe mosaic virus	Potyvirus		Potyviridae						Riboviria	ssRNA(+)
Habenaria mosaic virus	Potyvirus		Potyviridae						Riboviria	ssRNA(+)
Hardenbergia mosaic virus	Potyvirus		Potyviridae						Riboviria	ssRNA(+)
Henbane mosaic virus	Potyvirus		Potyviridae						Riboviria	ssRNA(+)
Hippeastrum mosaic virus	Potyvirus		Potyviridae						Riboviria	ssRNA(+)
Hyacinth mosaic virus	Potyvirus		Potyviridae						Riboviria	ssRNA(+)
Iris fulva mosaic virus	Potyvirus		Potyviridae						Riboviria	ssRNA(+)
Iris mild mosaic virus	Potyvirus		Potyviridae						Riboviria	ssRNA(+)
Iris severe mosaic virus	Potyvirus		Potyviridae						Riboviria	ssRNA(+)
Japanese yam mosaic virus	Potyvirus		Potyviridae						Riboviria	ssRNA(+)
Johnsongrass mosaic virus	Potyvirus		Potyviridae						Riboviria	ssRNA(+)
Kalanchoe mosaic virus	Potyvirus		Potyviridae						Riboviria	ssRNA(+)
Keunjorong mosaic virus	Potyvirus		Potyviridae						Riboviria	ssRNA(+)
Konjac mosaic virus	Potyvirus		Potyviridae						Riboviria	ssRNA(+)
Lettuce mosaic virus	Potyvirus		Potyviridae						Riboviria	ssRNA(+)
Lupinus mosaic virus	Potyvirus		Potyviridae						Riboviria	ssRNA(+)
Maize dwarf mosaic virus	Potyvirus		Potyviridae						Riboviria	ssRNA(+)
Moroccan watermelon mosaic virus	Potyvirus		Potyviridae						Riboviria	ssRNA(+)
Nothoscordum mosaic virus	Potyvirus		Potyviridae						Riboviria	ssRNA(+)
Ornithogalum mosaic virus	Potyvirus		Potyviridae						Riboviria	ssRNA(+)
Papaya leaf distortion mosaic virus	Potyvirus		Potyviridae						Riboviria	ssRNA(+)
Paris mosaic necrosis virus	Potyvirus		Potyviridae						Riboviria	ssRNA(+)
Parsnip mosaic virus	Potyvirus		Potyviridae						Riboviria	ssRNA(+)
Pea seed-borne mosaic virus	Potyvirus		Potyviridae						Riboviria	ssRNA(+)
Pecan mosaic-associated virus	Potyvirus		Potyviridae						Riboviria	ssRNA(+)
Pennisetum mosaic virus	Potyvirus		Potyviridae						Riboviria	ssRNA(+)
Pepper severe mosaic virus	Potyvirus		Potyviridae						Riboviria	ssRNA(+)
Pepper yellow mosaic virus	Potyvirus		Potyviridae						Riboviria	ssRNA(+)
Peru tomato mosaic virus	Potyvirus		Potyviridae						Riboviria	ssRNA(+)
Pfaffia mosaic virus	Potyvirus		Potyviridae						Riboviria	ssRNA(+)
Pokeweed mosaic virus	Potyvirus		Potyviridae						Riboviria	ssRNA(+)
Ranunculus mild mosaic virus	Potyvirus		Potyviridae						Riboviria	ssRNA(+)
Ranunculus mosaic virus	Potyvirus		Potyviridae						Riboviria	ssRNA(+)
Scallion mosaic virus	Potyvirus		Potyviridae						Riboviria	ssRNA(+)
Sorghum mosaic virus	Potyvirus		Potyviridae						Riboviria	ssRNA(+)
Soybean mosaic virus	Potyvirus		Potyviridae						Riboviria	ssRNA(+)
Spiranthes mosaic virus 3	Potyvirus		Potyviridae						Riboviria	ssRNA(+)
Sudan watermelon mosaic virus	Potyvirus		Potyviridae						Riboviria	ssRNA(+)
Sugarcane mosaic virus	Potyvirus		Potyviridae						Riboviria	ssRNA(+)
Sunflower mild mosaic virus	Potyvirus		Potyviridae						Riboviria	ssRNA(+)
Sunflower mosaic virus	Potyvirus		Potyviridae						Riboviria	ssRNA(+)
Telfairia mosaic virus	Potyvirus		Potyviridae						Riboviria	ssRNA(+)
Telosma mosaic virus	Potyvirus		Potyviridae						Riboviria	ssRNA(+)
Thunberg fritillary mosaic virus	Potyvirus		Potyviridae						Riboviria	ssRNA(+)
Tobacco vein banding mosaic virus	Potyvirus		Potyviridae						Riboviria	ssRNA(+)
Tradescantia mild mosaic virus	Potyvirus		Potyviridae						Riboviria	ssRNA(+)
Tuberose mild mosaic virus	Potyvirus		Potyviridae						Riboviria	ssRNA(+)
Tulip mosaic virus	Potyvirus		Potyviridae						Riboviria	ssRNA(+)
Turnip mosaic virus	Potyvirus		Potyviridae						Riboviria	ssRNA(+)
Vallota mosaic virus	Potyvirus		Potyviridae						Riboviria	ssRNA(+)
Vanilla distortion mosaic virus	Potyvirus		Potyviridae						Riboviria	ssRNA(+)
Watermelon mosaic virus	Potyvirus		Potyviridae						Riboviria	ssRNA(+)
Wild potato mosaic virus	Potyvirus		Potyviridae						Riboviria	ssRNA(+)
Wild tomato mosaic virus	Potyvirus		Potyviridae						Riboviria	ssRNA(+)
Wisteria vein mosaic virus	Potyvirus		Potyviridae						Riboviria	ssRNA(+)
Yam mild mosaic virus	Potyvirus		Potyviridae						Riboviria	ssRNA(+)
Yam mosaic virus	Potyvirus		Potyviridae						Riboviria	ssRNA(+)
Yambean mosaic virus	Potyvirus		Potyviridae						Riboviria	ssRNA(+)
Zantedeschia mild mosaic virus	Potyvirus		Potyviridae						Riboviria	ssRNA(+)
Zea mosaic virus	Potyvirus		Potyviridae						Riboviria	ssRNA(+)
Zucchini tigre mosaic virus	Potyvirus		Potyviridae						Riboviria	ssRNA(+)
Zucchini yellow mosaic virus	Potyvirus		Potyviridae						Riboviria	ssRNA(+)
Rose yellow mosaic virus	Roymovirus		Potyviridae						Riboviria	ssRNA(+)
Agropyron mosaic virus	Rymovirus		Potyviridae						Riboviria	ssRNA(+)
Hordeum mosaic virus	Rymovirus		Potyviridae						Riboviria	ssRNA(+)
Ryegrass mosaic virus	Rymovirus		Potyviridae						Riboviria	ssRNA(+)
Brome streak mosaic virus	Tritimovirus		Potyviridae						Riboviria	ssRNA(+)
Tall oatgrass mosaic virus	Tritimovirus		Potyviridae						Riboviria	ssRNA(+)
Wheat eqlid mosaic virus	Tritimovirus		Potyviridae						Riboviria	ssRNA(+)
Wheat streak mosaic virus	Tritimovirus		Potyviridae						Riboviria	ssRNA(+)
Yellow oat grass mosaic virus	Tritimovirus		Potyviridae						Riboviria	ssRNA(+)
Cymbidium chlorotic mosaic virus	Sobemovirus		Solemoviridae						Riboviria	ssRNA(+)
Sesbania mosaic virus	Sobemovirus		Solemoviridae						Riboviria	ssRNA(+)
Southern bean mosaic virus	Sobemovirus		Solemoviridae						Riboviria	ssRNA(+)
Southern cowpea mosaic virus	Sobemovirus		Solemoviridae						Riboviria	ssRNA(+)
Sowbane mosaic virus	Sobemovirus		Solemoviridae						Riboviria	ssRNA(+)
Soybean yellow common mosaic virus	Sobemovirus		Solemoviridae						Riboviria	ssRNA(+)
Opium poppy mosaic virus	Umbravirus	Calvusvirinae	Tombusviridae						Riboviria	ssRNA(+)
Pea enation mosaic virus 2	Umbravirus	Calvusvirinae	Tombusviridae						Riboviria	ssRNA(+)
Olive mild mosaic virus	Alphanecrovirus	Procedovirinae	Tombusviridae						Riboviria	ssRNA(+)
Johnsongrass chlorotic stripe mosaic virus	Aureusvirus	Procedovirinae	Tombusviridae						Riboviria	ssRNA(+)
Maize white line mosaic virus	Aureusvirus	Procedovirinae	Tombusviridae						Riboviria	ssRNA(+)
Galinsoga mosaic virus	Gallantivirus	Procedovirinae	Tombusviridae						Riboviria	ssRNA(+)
Soybean yellow mottle mosaic virus	Gammacarmovirus	Procedovirinae	Tombusviridae						Riboviria	ssRNA(+)
Cocksfoot mild mosaic virus	Panicovirus	Procedovirinae	Tombusviridae						Riboviria	ssRNA(+)
Panicum mosaic virus	Panicovirus	Procedovirinae	Tombusviridae						Riboviria	ssRNA(+)
Petunia asteroid mosaic virus	Tombusvirus	Procedovirinae	Tombusviridae						Riboviria	ssRNA(+)
Bean mild mosaic virus		Procedovirinae	Tombusviridae						Riboviria	ssRNA(+)
Red clover necrotic mosaic virus	Dianthovirus	Regressovirinae	Tombusviridae						Riboviria	ssRNA(+)
Sweet clover necrotic mosaic virus	Dianthovirus	Regressovirinae	Tombusviridae						Riboviria	ssRNA(+)
Chinese wheat mosaic virus	Furovirus		Virgaviridae						Riboviria	ssRNA(+)
Japanese soil-borne wheat mosaic virus	Furovirus		Virgaviridae						Riboviria	ssRNA(+)
Soil-borne cereal mosaic virus	Furovirus		Virgaviridae						Riboviria	ssRNA(+)
Soil-borne wheat mosaic virus	Furovirus		Virgaviridae						Riboviria	ssRNA(+)
Barley stripe mosaic virus	Hordeivirus		Virgaviridae						Riboviria	ssRNA(+)
Cucumber fruit mottle mosaic virus	Tobamovirus		Virgaviridae						Riboviria	ssRNA(+)
Cucumber green mottle mosaic virus	Tobamovirus		Virgaviridae						Riboviria	ssRNA(+)
Frangipani mosaic virus	Tobamovirus		Virgaviridae						Riboviria	ssRNA(+)
Kyuri green mottle mosaic virus	Tobamovirus		Virgaviridae						Riboviria	ssRNA(+)
Maracuja mosaic virus	Tobamovirus		Virgaviridae						Riboviria	ssRNA(+)
Passion fruit mosaic virus	Tobamovirus		Virgaviridae						Riboviria	ssRNA(+)
Plumeria mosaic virus	Tobamovirus		Virgaviridae						Riboviria	ssRNA(+)
Rehmannia mosaic virus	Tobamovirus		Virgaviridae						Riboviria	ssRNA(+)
Ribgrass mosaic virus	Tobamovirus		Virgaviridae						Riboviria	ssRNA(+)
Sunn-hemp mosaic virus	Tobamovirus		Virgaviridae						Riboviria	ssRNA(+)
Tobacco mild green mosaic virus	Tobamovirus		Virgaviridae						Riboviria	ssRNA(+)
Tobacco mosaic virus	Tobamovirus		Virgaviridae						Riboviria	ssRNA(+)
Tomato mosaic virus	Tobamovirus		Virgaviridae						Riboviria	ssRNA(+)
Tomato mottle mosaic virus	Tobamovirus		Virgaviridae						Riboviria	ssRNA(+)
Tropical soda apple mosaic virus	Tobamovirus		Virgaviridae						Riboviria	ssRNA(+)
Youcai mosaic virus	Tobamovirus		Virgaviridae						Riboviria	ssRNA(+)
Zucchini green mottle mosaic virus	Tobamovirus		Virgaviridae						Riboviria	ssRNA(+)
Cacao mild mosaic virus	Badnavirus		Caulimoviridae	Ortervirales	Revtraviricetes	Artverviricota	Pararnavirae		Riboviria	dsDNA-RT
Citrus yellow mosaic virus	Badnavirus		Caulimoviridae	Ortervirales	Revtraviricetes	Artverviricota	Pararnavirae		Riboviria	dsDNA-RT
Jujube mosaic-associated virus	Badnavirus		Caulimoviridae	Ortervirales	Revtraviricetes	Artverviricota	Pararnavirae		Riboviria	dsDNA-RT
Pagoda yellow mosaic associated virus	Badnavirus		Caulimoviridae	Ortervirales	Revtraviricetes	Artverviricota	Pararnavirae		Riboviria	dsDNA-RT
Cauliflower mosaic virus	Caulimovirus		Caulimoviridae	Ortervirales	Revtraviricetes	Artverviricota	Pararnavirae		Riboviria	dsDNA-RT
Dahlia mosaic virus	Caulimovirus		Caulimoviridae	Ortervirales	Revtraviricetes	Artverviricota	Pararnavirae		Riboviria	dsDNA-RT
Figwort mosaic virus	Caulimovirus		Caulimoviridae	Ortervirales	Revtraviricetes	Artverviricota	Pararnavirae		Riboviria	dsDNA-RT
Mirabilis mosaic virus	Caulimovirus		Caulimoviridae	Ortervirales	Revtraviricetes	Artverviricota	Pararnavirae		Riboviria	dsDNA-RT
Cassava vein mosaic virus	Cavemovirus		Caulimoviridae	Ortervirales	Revtraviricetes	Artverviricota	Pararnavirae		Riboviria	dsDNA-RT
Croton yellow vein mosaic alphasatellite	Clecrusatellite	Geminialphasatellitinae	Alphasatellitidae							ssDNA
Euphorbia yellow mosaic alphasatellite	Clecrusatellite	Geminialphasatellitinae	Alphasatellitidae							ssDNA
Melon chlorotic mosaic alphasatellite	Clecrusatellite	Geminialphasatellitinae	Alphasatellitidae							ssDNA
Cassava mosaic Madagascar alphasatellite	Colecusatellite	Geminialphasatellitinae	Alphasatellitidae							ssDNA
Malvastrum yellow mosaic alphasatellite	Colecusatellite	Geminialphasatellitinae	Alphasatellitidae							ssDNA
Malvastrum yellow mosaic Cameroon alphasatellite	Colecusatellite	Geminialphasatellitinae	Alphasatellitidae							ssDNA
Mesta yellow vein mosaic alphasatellite	Gosmusatellite	Geminialphasatellitinae	Alphasatellitidae							ssDNA
Abutilon golden mosaic virus	Begomovirus		Geminiviridae						ssDNA(+/−)	
Abutilon mosaic Bolivia virus	Begomovirus		Geminiviridae							ssDNA(+/−)
Abutilon mosaic Brazil virus	Begomovirus		Geminiviridae							ssDNA(+/−)
Abutilon mosaic virus	Begomovirus		Geminiviridae							ssDNA(+/−)
African cassava mosaic Burkina Faso virus	Begomovirus		Geminiviridae							ssDNA(+/−)
African cassava mosaic virus	Begomovirus		Geminiviridae							ssDNA(+/−)
Asystasia mosaic Madagascar virus	Begomovirus		Geminiviridae							ssDNA(+/−)
Bean calico mosaic virus	Begomovirus		Geminiviridae							ssDNA(+/−)
Bean dwarf mosaic virus	Begomovirus		Geminiviridae							ssDNA(+/−)
Bean golden mosaic virus	Begomovirus		Geminiviridae							ssDNA(+/−)
Bean golden yellow mosaic virus	Begomovirus		Geminiviridae							ssDNA(+/−)
Bean white chlorosis mosaic virus	Begomovirus		Geminiviridae							ssDNA(+/−)
Bean yellow mosaic Mexico virus	Begomovirus		Geminiviridae							ssDNA(+/−)
Bhendi yellow vein mosaic Delhi virus	Begomovirus		Geminiviridae							ssDNA(+/−)
Bhendi yellow vein mosaic virus	Begomovirus		Geminiviridae							ssDNA(+/−)
Cassava mosaic Madagascar virus	Begomovirus		Geminiviridae							ssDNA(+/−)
Catharanthus yellow mosaic virus	Begomovirus		Geminiviridae							ssDNA(+/−)
Chayote yellow mosaic virus	Begomovirus		Geminiviridae							ssDNA(+/−)
Cleome golden mosaic virus	Begomovirus		Geminiviridae							ssDNA(+/−)
Clerodendron golden mosaic virus	Begomovirus		Geminiviridae							ssDNA(+/−)
Clerodendron yellow mosaic virus	Begomovirus		Geminiviridae							ssDNA(+/−)
Clerodendrum golden mosaic China virus	Begomovirus		Geminiviridae							ssDNA(+/−)
Clerodendrum golden mosaic Jiangsu virus	Begomovirus		Geminiviridae							ssDNA(+/−)
Cnidoscolus mosaic leaf deformation virus	Begomovirus		Geminiviridae							ssDNA(+/−)
Coccinia mosaic Tamil Nadu virus	Begomovirus		Geminiviridae							ssDNA(+/−)
Common bean severe mosaic virus	Begomovirus		Geminiviridae							ssDNA(+/−)
Corchorus golden mosaic virus	Begomovirus		Geminiviridae							ssDNA(+/−)
Corchorus yellow vein mosaic virus	Begomovirus		Geminiviridae							ssDNA(+/−)
Cotton yellow mosaic virus	Begomovirus		Geminiviridae							ssDNA(+/−)
Cowpea golden mosaic virus	Begomovirus		Geminiviridae							ssDNA(+/−)
Croton yellow vein mosaic virus	Begomovirus		Geminiviridae							ssDNA(+/−)
Dalechampia chlorotic mosaic virus	Begomovirus		Geminiviridae							ssDNA(+/−)
Deinbollia mosaic virus	Begomovirus		Geminiviridae							ssDNA(+/−)
Dolichos yellow mosaic virus	Begomovirus		Geminiviridae							ssDNA(+/−)
East African cassava mosaic Cameroon virus	Begomovirus		Geminiviridae							ssDNA(+/−)
East African cassava mosaic Kenya virus	Begomovirus		Geminiviridae							ssDNA(+/−)
East African cassava mosaic Malawi virus	Begomovirus		Geminiviridae							ssDNA(+/−)
East African cassava mosaic virus	Begomovirus		Geminiviridae							ssDNA(+/−)
East African cassava mosaic Zanzibar virus	Begomovirus		Geminiviridae							ssDNA(+/−)
Erectites yellow mosaic virus	Begomovirus		Geminiviridae							ssDNA(+/−)
Eupatorium yellow vein mosaic virus	Begomovirus		Geminiviridae							ssDNA(+/−)
Euphorbia mosaic Peru virus	Begomovirus		Geminiviridae							ssDNA(+/−)
Euphorbia mosaic virus	Begomovirus		Geminiviridae							ssDNA(+/−)
Euphorbia yellow mosaic virus	Begomovirus		Geminiviridae							ssDNA(+/−)
Hedyotis uncinella yellow mosaic virus	Begomovirus		Geminiviridae							ssDNA(+/−)
Hemidesmus yellow mosaic virus	Begomovirus		Geminiviridae							ssDNA(+/−)
Hollyhock yellow vein mosaic virus	Begomovirus		Geminiviridae							ssDNA(+/−)
Horsegram yellow mosaic virus	Begomovirus		Geminiviridae							ssDNA(+/−)
Indian cassava mosaic virus	Begomovirus		Geminiviridae							ssDNA(+/−)
Jacquemontia mosaic Yucatan virus	Begomovirus		Geminiviridae							ssDNA(+/−)
Jacquemontia yellow mosaic virus	Begomovirus		Geminiviridae							ssDNA(+/−)
Jatropha leaf yellow mosaic virus	Begomovirus		Geminiviridae							ssDNA(+/−)
Jatropha mosaic India virus	Begomovirus		Geminiviridae							ssDNA(+/−)
Jatropha mosaic Nigeria virus	Begomovirus		Geminiviridae							ssDNA(+/−)
Jatropha mosaic virus	Begomovirus		Geminiviridae							ssDNA(+/−)
Jatropha yellow mosaic virus	Begomovirus		Geminiviridae							ssDNA(+/−)
Kudzu mosaic virus	Begomovirus		Geminiviridae							ssDNA(+/−)
Leonurus mosaic virus	Begomovirus		Geminiviridae							ssDNA(+/−)
Luffa yellow mosaic virus	Begomovirus		Geminiviridae							ssDNA(+/−)
Lycianthes yellow mosaic virus	Begomovirus		Geminiviridae							ssDNA(+/−)
Macroptilium bright mosaic virus	Begomovirus		Geminiviridae							ssDNA(+/−)
Macroptilium common mosaic virus	Begomovirus		Geminiviridae							ssDNA(+/−)
Macroptilium golden mosaic virus	Begomovirus		Geminiviridae							ssDNA(+/−)
Macroptilium mosaic Puerto Rico virus	Begomovirus		Geminiviridae							ssDNA(+/−)
Macroptilium yellow mosaic Florida virus	Begomovirus		Geminiviridae							ssDNA(+/−)
Macroptilium yellow mosaic virus	Begomovirus		Geminiviridae							ssDNA(+/−)
Malvastrum bright yellow mosaic virus	Begomovirus		Geminiviridae							ssDNA(+/−)
Malvastrum yellow mosaic Helshire virus	Begomovirus		Geminiviridae							ssDNA(+/−)
Malvastrum yellow mosaic Jamaica virus	Begomovirus		Geminiviridae							ssDNA(+/−)
Malvastrum yellow mosaic virus	Begomovirus		Geminiviridae							ssDNA(+/−)
Melochia mosaic virus	Begomovirus		Geminiviridae							ssDNA(+/−)
Melochia yellow mosaic virus	Begomovirus		Geminiviridae							ssDNA(+/−)
Melon chlorotic mosaic virus	Begomovirus		Geminiviridae							ssDNA(+/−)
Merremia mosaic Puerto Rico virus	Begomovirus		Geminiviridae							ssDNA(+/−)
Merremia mosaic virus	Begomovirus		Geminiviridae							ssDNA(+/−)
Mesta yellow vein mosaic Bahraich virus	Begomovirus		Geminiviridae							ssDNA(+/−)
Mesta yellow vein mosaic virus	Begomovirus		Geminiviridae							ssDNA(+/−)
Mungbean yellow mosaic India virus	Begomovirus		Geminiviridae							ssDNA(+/−)
Mungbean yellow mosaic virus	Begomovirus		Geminiviridae							ssDNA(+/−)
Okra yellow mosaic Mexico virus	Begomovirus		Geminiviridae							ssDNA(+/−)
Pavonia mosaic virus	Begomovirus		Geminiviridae							ssDNA(+/−)
Pavonia yellow mosaic virus	Begomovirus		Geminiviridae							ssDNA(+/−)
Pepper golden mosaic virus	Begomovirus		Geminiviridae							ssDNA(+/−)
Potato yellow mosaic Panama virus	Begomovirus		Geminiviridae							ssDNA(+/−)
Potato yellow mosaic virus	Begomovirus		Geminiviridae							ssDNA(+/−)
Pouzolzia golden mosaic virus	Begomovirus		Geminiviridae							ssDNA(+/−)
Pouzolzia mosaic Guangdong virus	Begomovirus		Geminiviridae							ssDNA(+/−)
Pouzolzia yellow mosaic virus	Begomovirus		Geminiviridae							ssDNA(+/−)
Pumpkin yellow mosaic virus	Begomovirus		Geminiviridae							ssDNA(+/−)
Ramie mosaic Yunnan virus	Begomovirus		Geminiviridae							ssDNA(+/-)
Rhynchosia golden mosaic Havana virus	Begomovirus		Geminiviridae							ssDNA(+/−)
Rhynchosia golden mosaic Sinaloa virus	Begomovirus		Geminiviridae							ssDNA(+/−)
Rhynchosia golden mosaic virus	Begomovirus		Geminiviridae							ssDNA(+/−)
Rhynchosia mild mosaic virus	Begomovirus		Geminiviridae							ssDNA(+/−)
Rhynchosia rugose golden mosaic virus	Begomovirus		Geminiviridae							ssDNA(+/−)
Rhynchosia yellow mosaic India virus	Begomovirus		Geminiviridae							ssDNA(+/−)
Rhynchosia yellow mosaic virus	Begomovirus		Geminiviridae							ssDNA(+/−)
Senecio yellow mosaic virus	Begomovirus		Geminiviridae							ssDNA(+/−)
Sida angular mosaic virus	Begomovirus		Geminiviridae							ssDNA(+/−)
Sida bright yellow mosaic virus	Begomovirus		Geminiviridae							ssDNA(+/−)
Sida ciliaris golden mosaic virus	Begomovirus		Geminiviridae							ssDNA(+/−)
Sida common mosaic virus	Begomovirus		Geminiviridae							ssDNA(+/−)
Sida golden mosaic Braco virus	Begomovirus		Geminiviridae							ssDNA(+/−)
Sida golden mosaic Brazil virus	Begomovirus		Geminiviridae							ssDNA(+/−)
Sida golden mosaic Buckup virus	Begomovirus		Geminiviridae							ssDNA(+/−)
Sida golden mosaic Costa Rica virus	Begomovirus		Geminiviridae							ssDNA(+/−)
Sida golden mosaic Florida virus	Begomovirus		Geminiviridae							ssDNA(+/-)
Sida golden mosaic Lara virus	Begomovirus		Geminiviridae							ssDNA(+/-)
Sida golden mosaic virus	Begomovirus		Geminiviridae							ssDNA(+/-)
Sida micrantha mosaic virus	Begomovirus		Geminiviridae							ssDNA(+/-)
Sida mosaic Alagoas virus	Begomovirus		Geminiviridae							ssDNA(+/-)
Sida mosaic Bolivia virus 1	Begomovirus		Geminiviridae							ssDNA(+/-)
Sida mosaic Bolivia virus 2	Begomovirus		Geminiviridae							ssDNA(+/-)
Sida mosaic Sinaloa virus	Begomovirus		Geminiviridae							ssDNA(+/-)
Sida yellow mosaic Alagoas virus	Begomovirus		Geminiviridae							ssDNA(+/-)
Sida yellow mosaic China virus	Begomovirus		Geminiviridae							ssDNA(+/-)
Sida yellow mosaic virus	Begomovirus		Geminiviridae							ssDNA(+/-)
Sida yellow mosaic Yucatan virus	Begomovirus		Geminiviridae							ssDNA(+/-)
Solanum mosaic Bolivia virus	Begomovirus		Geminiviridae							ssDNA(+/-)
South African cassava mosaic virus	Begomovirus		Geminiviridae							ssDNA(+/-)
Soybean blistering mosaic virus	Begomovirus		Geminiviridae							ssDNA(+/-)
Sri Lankan cassava mosaic virus	Begomovirus		Geminiviridae							ssDNA(+/-)
Sweet potato mosaic virus	Begomovirus		Geminiviridae							ssDNA(+/-)
Telfairia golden mosaic virus	Begomovirus		Geminiviridae							ssDNA(+/-)
Tomato bright yellow mosaic virus	Begomovirus		Geminiviridae							ssDNA(+/-)
Tomato common mosaic virus	Begomovirus		Geminiviridae							ssDNA(+/-)
Tomato golden mosaic virus	Begomovirus		Geminiviridae							ssDNA(+/-)
Tomato mild mosaic virus	Begomovirus		Geminiviridae							ssDNA(+/-)
Tomato mosaic Havana virus	Begomovirus		Geminiviridae							ssDNA(+/-)
Tomato rugose mosaic virus	Begomovirus		Geminiviridae							ssDNA(+/-)
Tomato wrinkled mosaic virus	Begomovirus		Geminiviridae							ssDNA(+/-)
Triumfetta yellow mosaic virus	Begomovirus		Geminiviridae							ssDNA(+/-)
Velvet bean golden mosaic virus	Begomovirus		Geminiviridae							ssDNA(+/-)
Velvet bean severe mosaic virus	Begomovirus		Geminiviridae							ssDNA(+/-)
Vigna yellow mosaic virus	Begomovirus		Geminiviridae							ssDNA(+/-)
Wissadula golden mosaic virus	Begomovirus		Geminiviridae							ssDNA(+/-)
Wissadula yellow mosaic virus	Begomovirus		Geminiviridae							ssDNA(+/-)
Bromus catharticus striate mosaic virus	Mastrevirus		Geminiviridae							ssDNA(+/-)
Chloris striate mosaic virus	Mastrevirus		Geminiviridae							ssDNA(+/-)
Digitaria ciliaris striate mosaic virus	Mastrevirus		Geminiviridae							ssDNA(+/-)
Digitaria didactyla striate mosaic virus	Mastrevirus		Geminiviridae							ssDNA(+/-)
Maize striate mosaic virus	Mastrevirus		Geminiviridae							ssDNA(+/-)
Paspalum dilatatum striate mosaic virus	Mastrevirus		Geminiviridae							ssDNA(+/-)
Paspalum striate mosaic virus	Mastrevirus		Geminiviridae							ssDNA(+/-)
Sporobolus striate mosaic virus 1	Mastrevirus		Geminiviridae							ssDNA(+/-)
Sporobolus striate mosaic virus 2	Mastrevirus		Geminiviridae							ssDNA(+/-)
Switchgrass mosaic-associated virus	Mastrevirus		Geminiviridae							ssDNA(+/-)
Mulberry mosaic dwarf associated virus			Geminiviridae							ssDNA(+/-)
Bhendi yellow vein mosaic betasatellite	Betasatellite		Tolecusatellitidae							ssDNA
Croton yellow vein mosaic betasatellite	Betasatellite		Tolecusatellitidae							ssDNA
Eupatorium yellow vein mosaic betasatellite	Betasatellite		Tolecusatellitidae							ssDNA
Hedyotis yellow mosaic betasatellite	Betasatellite		Tolecusatellitidae							ssDNA
Honeysuckle yellow vein mosaic betasatellite	Betasatellite		Tolecusatellitidae							ssDNA
Momordica yellow mosaic betasatellite	Betasatellite		Tolecusatellitidae							ssDNA
Mungbean yellow mosaic betasatellite	Betasatellite		Tolecusatellitidae							ssDNA
Rhynchosia yellow mosaic betasatellite	Betasatellite		Tolecusatellitidae							ssDNA
