= Oat blue dwarf virus =

Virus classification
- (unranked): Virus
- Realm: Riboviria
- Kingdom: Orthornavirae
- Phylum: Kitrinoviricota
- Class: Alsuviricetes
- Order: Tymovirales
- Family: Tymoviridae
- Genus: Marafivirus
- Species: Marafivirus avenae

Synonyms
- Flax crinkle virus

Species of virus

Oat blue dwarf virus (OBDV) is a plant pathogenic virus of the family Tymoviridae. It replicates within leafhopper vectors, and when these vectors feed, the virus is transmitted to the plant. It can infect oats and barley.
