= Maculavirus =

Virus classification
- (unranked): Virus
- Realm: Riboviria
- Kingdom: Orthornavirae
- Phylum: Kitrinoviricota
- Class: Alsuviricetes
- Order: Tymovirales
- Family: Tymoviridae
- Genus: Maculavirus

Genus of viruses

Maculavirus is a genus of viruses in the order Tymovirales, in the family Tymoviridae. Plants serve as natural hosts. There is only one species in this genus: Grapevine fleck virus (Maculavirus vitis).

== Structure ==
Viruses in Maculavirus are non-enveloped, with icosahedral and isometric geometries. The diameter is around 30 nm. Genomes are linear, around 7.5kb in length.

Genus	Structure	Symmetry	Capsid	Genomic arrangement	Genomic segmentation
Maculavirus	Icosahedral	T=3	Non-enveloped	Linear	Monopartite

== Life cycle ==
Entry into the host cell is achieved by penetration into the host cell. Replication follows the positive stranded RNA virus replication model. Positive stranded RNA virus transcription is the method of transcription. The virus exits the host cell by monopartite non-tubule guided viral movement. Plants serve as the natural host. The virus is transmitted via a vector (unknown). Transmission routes are vector and mechanical.

Genus	Host details	Tissue tropism	Entry details	Release details	Replication site	Assembly site	Transmission
Maculavirus	Plants	None	Viral movement; mechanical inoculation	Viral movement	Cytoplasm	Cytoplasm	Mechanical inoculation: pseudococcid mealybugs; Mechanical inoculation: aphids
