= Narcissus latent virus =

Virus classification
- (unranked): Virus
- Realm: Riboviria
- Kingdom: Orthornavirae
- Phylum: Pisuviricota
- Class: Stelpaviricetes
- Order: Patatavirales
- Family: Potyviridae
- Genus: Macluravirus
- Species: Macluravirus narcissi

Synonyms
- Irisbontvirus; Narcissus mild mottle virus

Species of virus causing disease in narcissi and irises

Narcissus latent virus (NLV) is a plant virus in the genus Macluravirus of the family Potyviridae, which infects Narcissus.

== Description ==
Characterised by Brunt in 1976, it is found in Western Europe in Narcissus, Nerine and bulbous irises. It is often accompanied by other plant viruses, and is transmitted by aphids. It produces light and dark green mottling near the leaf tips.

== Bibliography ==
- Smith, I.M., ed. (1988). European Handbook of Plant Diseases. Oxford: Wiley. ISBN 1444314181.
- Hanna BERNIAK, Beata KOMOROWSKA, Dariusz SOCHACKI. DETECTION OF NARCISSUS LATENT VIRUS ISOLATES USING ONE-STEP RT-PCR ASSAY, Journal of Horticultural Research 2013, vol. 21(1): 11-14 DOI: 10.2478/johr-2013-0002
