= Hordeum mosaic virus =

Virus classification
- (unranked): Virus
- Realm: Riboviria
- Kingdom: Orthornavirae
- Phylum: Pisuviricota
- Class: Stelpaviricetes
- Order: Patatavirales
- Family: Potyviridae
- Genus: Rymovirus
- Species: Rymovirus hordei

Pathogenic virus

Hordeum mosaic virus (HoMV) is a pathogenic plant virus. It affects barley crops.

== Hosts ==
Hosts include Hordeum jubatum (Foxtail Barley).

== Taxonomy ==
Forms a highly divergent clade within Potyvirus with the closely related Agropyron mosaic virus.

== See also ==
- List of barley diseases
