= Cacao yellow mosaic virus =

Virus classification
- (unranked): Virus
- Realm: Riboviria
- Kingdom: Orthornavirae
- Phylum: Kitrinoviricota
- Class: Alsuviricetes
- Order: Tymovirales
- Family: Tymoviridae
- Genus: Tymovirus
- Species: Tymovirus theobromatis

Species of virus

Cacao yellow mosaic virus (CYMV) is a virus in the family Tymoviridae that infects cacao trees in Sierra Leone.

== Description ==
CYMV, like other Tymoviridae are non-enveloped viruses, surrounded by a capsid approximately 30 nanometers wide. The viral capsid has T = 3 symmetry. Tymoviridae have positive-sense single-stranded RNA genomes approximately 6 kilobases long.

== Disease ==
In the cacao tree, CYMV infection leads to the appearance of large circular yellow blotches on the leaves. Infected trees are not killed or severely inhibited.

== Ecology and distribution ==
CYMV has only been found in Sierra Leone where it primarily infects the cacao tree Theobroma cacao. However, it can experimentally infect a number of other dicots including Chenopodium amaranticolor, Chenopodium quinoa, Tetragonia expansa, Vinca rosea, Nicotiana clevelandii, and Nicandra physalodes.
