= Cardamom mosaic virus =

Virus classification
- (unranked): Virus
- Realm: Riboviria
- Kingdom: Orthornavirae
- Phylum: Pisuviricota
- Class: Stelpaviricetes
- Order: Patatavirales
- Family: Potyviridae
- Genus: Macluravirus
- Species: Macluravirus cardamomi

Synonyms
- Katte disease

Species of virus

Cardamom mosaic virus (CdMV) is a mosaic virus that affects the production of green cardamom (E. cardamomum). It is a member of the genus Macluravirus (recognized under the family Potyviridae by ICTV in 1988), and is transmitted through aphids (P. caladii) and infected rhizomes, the former in a non-persistent manner.

== Host and symptoms ==
Green cardamom is one of the world's very ancient spices. Known as the “queen of spices”, because of their aroma and flavor, it is one of the most exotic and highly priced spices. It is the world's third most expensive spice after vanilla and saffron. Although India is the top producer of the spice, producing 31.1% of the world's cardamom followed by Guatemala and Nepal, Guatemala is the top exporter (exporting 43.6% of the world's cardamom) followed by Nepal and India.

Cardamom suffers from several oomycetous, fungal, viral, nematode-induced diseases and pests that affect the productivity and the industry as a whole. Among them, "mosaic disease" or "katte disease" is one of the major diseases in cardamom that has resulted in a reduction in its production.

The virus was reported at first in southern India in the 1900s by Mollison and it has also highly affected Guatemala and Sri Lanka. The disease is widely distributed among cardamom-cultivating regions. The cardamom production industry in some parts of Guatemala started showing symptoms of the disease, after which all nearby plantations of the southern-pacific coastal region (producing 60% of the total cardamom) were infected with the disease. Recent surveys conducted in cardamom-producing areas of India for CdMV have revealed its prevalence in most of the cardamom plantations in Karnataka. It has been reported that based on the time and stage of infection, there is a variation in yield loss due to CdMV. It has been reported that early infection at a young stage leads to almost 100%, whereas higher crop loss ranges from 38 to 68.7% from first to the third year for monocultured cardamom, leading to declining of the infected plants occurring within 3 to 5 years (the economic cycle of a healthy cardamom plant starts from the third year and can last up to 8–10 years). Chemical management practices, breeding for resistance and cross-protection show limited success against CdMV. Early detection of the virus, use of virus-free seedlings, and eradication of the vector and infected clumps are a few methods of CdMV disease management.

=== Causal agent and its genome characterization ===
Virions of the genus Macluravirus are non-enveloped, flexuous, and filamentous, measuring 650-660 nm lengthwise with a 10-12 nm diameter and pinwheel-type inclusion bodies relating it to the family of potyviruses. The CdMV genomes are single-stranded linear positive-sense RNA as reported by Jacob and Usha (2001). As a result of amplification, cloning, sequencing and gene expression, it can be reported that CdMV contains ~8.5kb of genomes, presence coding regions for partial Cytoplasmic Inclusion, CdMV encoded proteins: complete Nuclear Inclusion b (NIb) gene in the genome which is the RNA-dependent RNA polymerase (RdRp), Nuclear Inclusion a (NIa) Protease (Nia 1 protease) and a complete 6K2 genome-linked viral protein. The coat protein of potyvirus is a suitable carrier to display the epitopes of the pathogens. The sequencing of coat proteins and 3’ UTR regions of different isolated strains of CdMV from different cardamom-growing geographical regions in India revealed that there are three different CdMV strains causing disease on the basis of severity of symptoms on young and matured leaves, transmission efficiency, effect on plant height and leaf area. The strains varied in the N-terminal region of coat protein in their sequence.

=== Host range ===
There is a long association between the infection of Macluravirus and spice crops. They have a narrow host range infecting families Amaranthaceae, Asteraceae, Iridaceae, Dioscoreaceae, Amaryllidaceae, Moraceae, Aizoaceae, Ranunculaceae and Zingiberaceae. For CdMV, the natural hosts are small cardamom (Elettaria cardamomum) along with their other hosts that belong to the family Zingiberaceae-Amomum connecarpum, A. invollucraltum, A. microstephanum, A. muricatum, A. pterocarpum, A. subulatum, Alpinia neutans, Alpinia mutica, Curcuma neilgherrensis, Hedychium flavescens, Zingiber cernuum, and Maranta arundinacea of family Marantaceae

=== Symptoms ===
The expression of symptoms associated with the disease varies according to the varieties grown, growing region and strain variations; these include mild to severe mosaic, overall chlorosis, chlorotic flecks and necrotic and ring spots. The virus infection is systemic in nature that gradually spreads to all tillers in a clump and can infect plants of all stages.

The first visible symptom of the disease is seen on the youngest leaves of the affected tiller that appear as spindle shaped slender chlorotic flecks (2–5 mm in length). The flecks later develop into pale green discontinuous stripes that run parallel to the vein form the midrib to leaf margin. The mosaic symptoms are masked as the leaves mature. The next emerging leaves of the infected plant will show the characteristic mosaic symptoms over the entire lamina. The mosaic type mottling is often seen on the leaf sheaths and young shoots. The mature leaves formed before infection do not develop symptoms. As the disease advances, the size of the leaves eventually creating a negative effect in the plant's vigor and causing stunting of the clump with a few slender tillers and shorter panicles. The plants infected by mosaic or Katte can survive for many years and act as the source of inoculum.

Virus Transmission and Spread

The virus is transmitted through the aphid vector Pentalonia caladii (formerly P. nigronervosa f. caladii). They are also transmitted by infected rhizomes, infected clones, seedlings raised in the vicinity of infected plantations, volunteer plants, and a few of the infected zingiberacae. Along with P. caladii, various other species of aphid have been reported to transmit the virus. The virus can be transmitted by both the nymphal and the adult stages, but efficiency increases with age of the vector; alate and apterous form are the most efficient.

In plantations, aphids are prevalent throughout the year, although a decline occurs during monsoon season. The migrating population was found to be the maximum during January–February, while the populations of alate vectors were found higher during November to May. The primary spread in the plantation occurs due to active viruliferous alate forms of the vector at random with a radius of 400–600 m from the virus source. The secondary spread is internal with low rate of spread and as the apterate adults become active, there comes a centrifugal influx of the primary source. The secondary spread was found to be gradient within 40m radius from the initial source in India while in Guatemala, the rate of disease spread was very fast (83% within 6 months of plantation).

In the field, CdMV incubated from 20 to 114 days at different months; their expression is influenced by growth of the plants. When the plants are in active phase of growth (May–November) the symptoms start expressing and develop on young seedlings (3-4 leaves stage) within 15–20 days of incubation, while, the expression is slowed due to prolonged incubation period (December – March) and it expressed in the adults only after 30–40 days of incubation during active times (90–120 days during winter months). Although the aphid population increased during November to May in the field and decreased during the monsoon, they were found throughout the year.

== Control / management ==
For successful management of any disease, an integrated disease management strategy needs to be developed. The following are some disease management strategies for CdMV:

- Use of healthy plant material for further cultivation
- Early detection using the methods mentioned above and accurate identification of the virus involved.
- Regular monitoring, tracing out, rouging and elimination of infected clumps of cardamom, remnants of infected plants.
- Use of virus free seedlings for large scale multiplication and planting.
- The nurseries where the nucleus planting materials are grown should be kept in isolated locations and it should be obtained from disease-free plants.
- Monitoring of the collateral hosts that may serve as the breeding sites of the vectors.
- For aphids transmitting virus in non- or semi-persistent manner, chemical control measures are not considered effective for managing the viral disease. However, spraying recommended dose of insecticides after eliminating the infected hosts and also oil spraying the plants does increase the efficiency in controlling the vector.
- The vector can also be controlled by spreading their predators or entomopathogens like Beauveria bassiana, Verticillium chlamydosporium and Paecilomyces lilacinus that feed on the aphids.
- Resistance breeding in cardamom against CdMV has been in the process. For example, the lines NKE 9 and NKE 12 that are resistant to CdMV has been released for breeding in different parts of cardamom growing areas in India [11]. However, it is a lengthy, expensive and cumbersome process. Therefore, there are researches are still in progress to develop transgenic cardamom resistant to CdMV.
