= Deltasatellite =

Virus classification
- Informal group: Subviral agents
- Informal group: Satellite nucleic acids
- Family: Tolecusatellitidae
- Genus: Deltasatellite

Species
- See text

Genus of viruses

Deltasatellite is a genus of satellite nucleic acids in the family Tolecusatellitidae. The genus contains 13 species.

== Name ==
The name Deltasatellite is a combination of Delta, often used in molecular biology to indicate a mutation or deletion, and satellitidae, the fact that it is a satellite.

== Taxonomy ==
The genus contains the following species:

- Deltasatellite brassicae
- Deltasatellite codiaeumiflavi
- Deltasatellite desmodii
- Deltasatellite ipomoeaprimi
- Deltasatellite ipomoeasecundi
- Deltasatellite ipomoeatertii
- Deltasatellite malvastri
- Deltasatellite sidaflavusprimi
- Deltasatellite sidaflavussecundi
- Deltasatellite sidaflavustertii
- Deltasatellite solani
- Deltasatellite solaniflavusprimi
- Deltasatellite solaniflavussecundi
