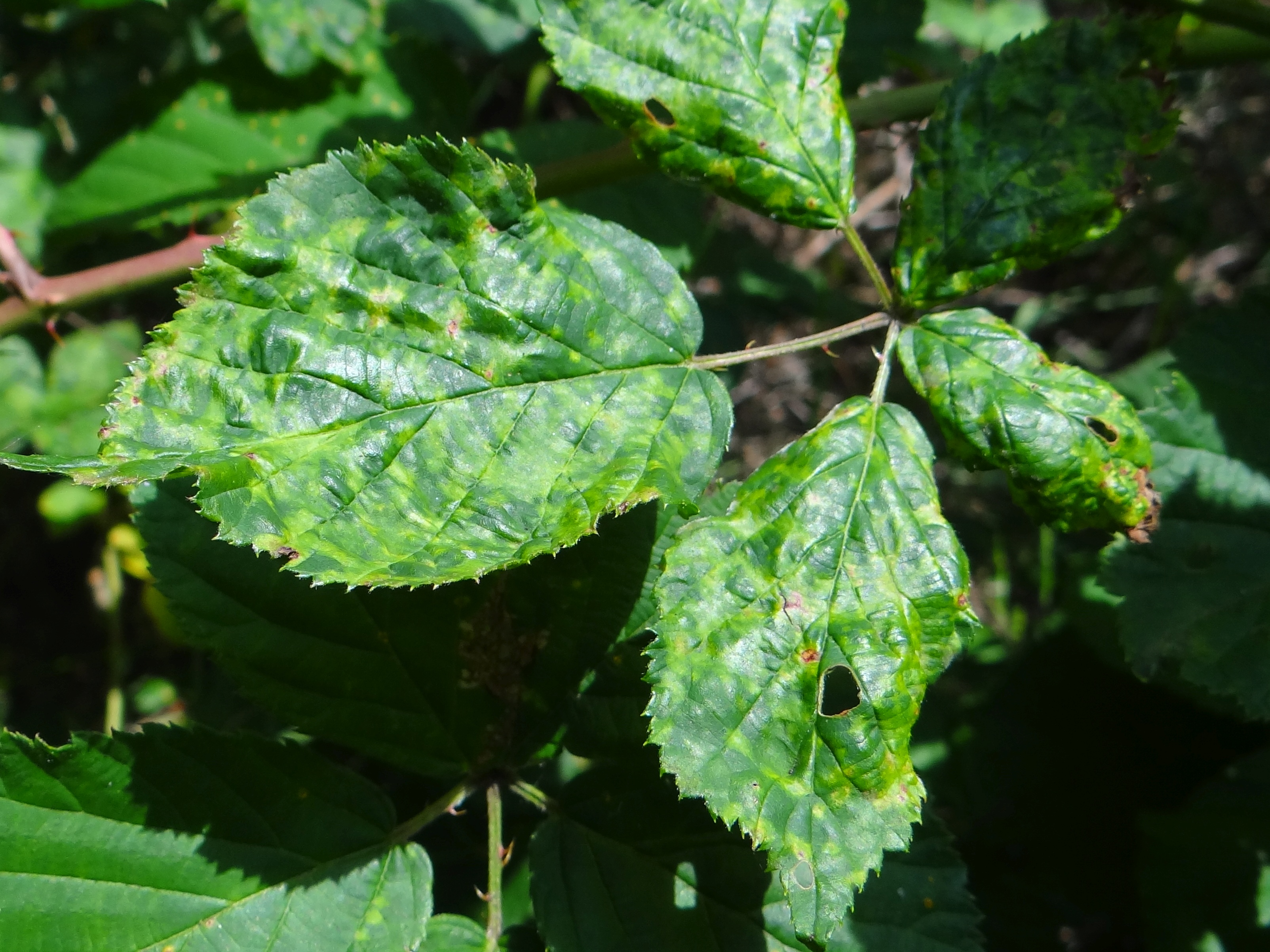
- Mosaic pattern on leaves of raspberry plant, also a characteristic of Blueberry mosaic associated virus

Virus classification
- (unranked): Virus
- Realm: Riboviria
- Kingdom: Orthornavirae
- Phylum: Negarnaviricota
- Class: Milneviricetes
- Order: Serpentovirales
- Family: Aspiviridae
- Genus: Ophiovirus
- Species: Ophiovirus vaccinii
- Virus: Blueberry mosaic associated virus

= Blueberry mosaic associated virus =

Species of virus

Blueberry mosaic associated virus (B1MaV) is a plant virus which infects blueberry plants, causing a discoloration of the leaves of the plants in a mosaic-like pattern. The disease is found in blueberry plants in many regions of North America, as well as South America, Europe, New Zealand, and South Africa. Within these regions the virus is most often found in high blueberry-yielding areas, but can be spread to other locations. Blueberry mosaic associated virus is one of eight species in the genus Ophiovirus. It is a member of the Aspiviridae family, in the Serpentovirales order, and in the Milnevircetes class. Viruses in Aspiviridae are characterized by a flexible and elongated nucleocapsid that is composed mostly of filamentous structures and is helically symmetrical. It also has a non-enveloped protein capsid that is capable of coiling around itself allowing for a super-coiled structure and the helical symmetry. The virus has the potential to be symptomatic or asymptomatic within plants causing the display of symptoms in only a few plants, but the ability to transmit the virus unknowingly in many plants. B1MaV often remains asymptomatic for long periods of time after initial infection allowing for blind transmission.

== Symptoms ==
When a plant is initially infected with the virus the plant will often display a symptom-free period, meaning there is long latent period between viral infection and symptom appearance. The virus can also become dormant in some areas of the plant and expressed in others, causing some leaves to display symptoms and others to be asymptomatic.

When a blueberry plant begins to show symptoms of infection by B1MaV a mild to severe mottle and mosaic patterns on foliage appears. The pattern is in the colors of yellow, yellow green, and pink. Usually symptoms appear on only a few leaves, but can appear on more of the plant in severe seasons. The infection also causes late ripening of fruit, reduced yield of the crop, and poor quality of the berries, as the virus spreads throughout the plant and begins affecting cellular mechanisms. The virus does not kill the plant, however, rather it just affects the quality and quantity of fruit produced by the plant.

== Structure ==
Blueberry mosaic associated virus's virion is described as a nonenveloped nucleocapsid. It is a naked filamentous nucleocapsid that can form circles making the open form of the virus or can form a pseudo-linear duplex form that forms the collapsed form of the virus. The nucleocapsid is 3 nm in diameter and 700 to 2000 nm long, pseudo-linear duplex are about 9-10 nm in diameter. Aspiviridae are composed of 3 to 4 RNA segments, with each segment being individually encapsulated. In the case of B1MaV, there are three RNA segments, and therefore each segment is encapsulated by a nucleocapsid protein. Each encapsulated structure contains a viral and viral complementary RNA strand (vRNA and vcRNA). The population structure is highly conserved in B1MaV as a result of low genetic diversity among isolates of the virus.

== Genome ==
The genome is a linear segmented genome that is 11,467 nucleotides long and is composed of three negative single strand RNA sequences. RNA one is the longest RNA sequence and contains two open reading frames (ORFs) that encode two proteins. The proteins encoded include a 23 kDa protein that has an unknown function and a 272 kDa RdRp (RNA-dependent RNA polymerase) replicase. The presence of these two ORFs in the largest RNA strand and the two ORF's having the same polarity is a key genomic feature of Aspiviridae. The RdRp encoded has five conserved motifs (A-E). The SDD sequence which is a characteristic sequence for segmented negative strand RNA viruses such as Aspiviridae is found in motif C of the RdRp. RNA 2 encodes for a 58 kDa movement protein that is thought to also be involved in the suppression of post transcriptional gene silencing. RNA 3 encodes 50 kDa nucleocapsid protein.

The 5’ terminal sequences are not conserved between RNA transmissions, but all of the 5’ termini fold into conserved stem-loop structures. These structures are likely involved in packaging of the genomic RNAs into their capsid or in long-distance interactions for transcription and translation. The 3’ terminal of all three RNAs are identical and conserved. The conserved nucleotide sequence is ‘AAUAUC’.

Aspiviridae have a G+C content is 32.3-39.8%. The genome of Aspiviridae is typically 11.3-12.5 kilobytes long. These viral RNA sequences appear in higher concentrations in symptomatic leaves then in asymptomatic leaves of the same plant.

== Replication cycle ==
=== Entry into cell ===
Aspiviridae travel from cell to cell in a plant via plasmodesmata and often alter the flexibility of the plasmodesmata by affecting proteins such as movement proteins of the virus. The movement proteins that the virus encodes in RNA 2, often effect cellular mechanisms for transport to distant tissues in the plant. B1MaV has nuclear localization signals within its protein sequences. These amino acid sequences tag the protein for import into the cell's nucleus via nuclear transport mechanisms of the cell.

=== Replication and transcription ===
B1MaV is translated from mRNA which is complementary to the vRNAs of the virus genome. Replication of ophioviruses as well as virion assembly is believed to occur in the cytoplasm.

== Modulation of host processes ==
There are several proteins produced by the viral mRNA in transcription and translation that affect the host cells processes, making a more suitable environment for viral replication and transcription. There is not much information known as to exactly what viral proteins interfere with the host cell processes.

One protein that is encoded on RNA 2 is the movement protein for B1MaV. This protein helps the virus travel between cells via plasmodesmata. It also is involved in suppression in post translational gene silencing of cellular genes, therefore preventing the silencing of some cellular genes causing consequent expression and the effects of these expressed genes.

== Tropism ==
The virus is transmissible via grafting, meaning that when an infected plant is joined with a noninfected plant to promote continued growth of the plant, the infected plant spreads the virus to the once noninfected plant. Asymptomatic plants can serve as reservoirs for the pathogen that can in turn spread the disease to highly susceptible plants. The virus can further spread to new growing areas accidentally by plant nurseries since blueberries are reproduced asexually and asymptomatic blueberry plants may be used. Aspiviridae are also transmitted through the soil via fungi. This would allow B1MaV to survive in the spores of an infected root fungi leading to further spread. Since the viral genome is three segmented negative RNA strands, there is the possibility for re-assortment of genetic segments between B1MaV and other segmented viruses infecting the same plant, leading to possible further transmission of the virus by other means.

== Associated diseases ==
=== Citrus psorosis virus ===
Citrus psorosis virus (CPsV) is a viral infection that infects citrus plants causing a major loss in citrus trees by affecting their conductive tissues. Some characteristic symptoms of the disease include bark scaling in the trunk and main branches of an adult plant as well as internal staining in the underlying wood. As in B1MaV this virus has three segmented negative RNA strands within its genome. Citrus psorosis virus also has three negative stranded RNA sequences encased in a protein coat. They also have the closet molecular structure to that of B1MaV in the Ophiovirus genus. This I shown in the analysis of the conserved RdRp motifs in B1MaV and CPsV. The infection occurs in the phloem and parenchyma cells of the citrus trees. The main cytopathic changes of the infected cells are the presence of a large number of abnormal chloroplasts, as well as mitochondria and cellular abnormalities. There has also been reports of lower levels of auxin as a result of viral infection. The species most severally infected are sweet oranges, grapefruit, and mandarin trees. Just as in B1MaV, CpsV is graft transmissible and also appears to remain asymptomatic for the first several years of infection.

=== Lettuce ring necrosis virus ===
Lettuce ring necrosis is a viral infection that affects lettuce leaves, causing necrotic ring like patterns on the middle of leaves. The infected leaves often decay and make the whole plant unusable. As with B1MaV, the lettuce ring necrosis virus spreads via soil transmission through fungal zoospores, and the symptoms in the plant often do not appear for several weeks to months after infection. This virus is a member of the Ophiovirus family and therefore has many of the same genome and structural characteristics as that of B1MaV. This virus often occurs along with lettuce big-vein virus. Lettuce big-vein virus causes the veins of the plant to be banded and sometimes bumpy affecting the quality of the plant causing underdevelopment making the plant unusable
