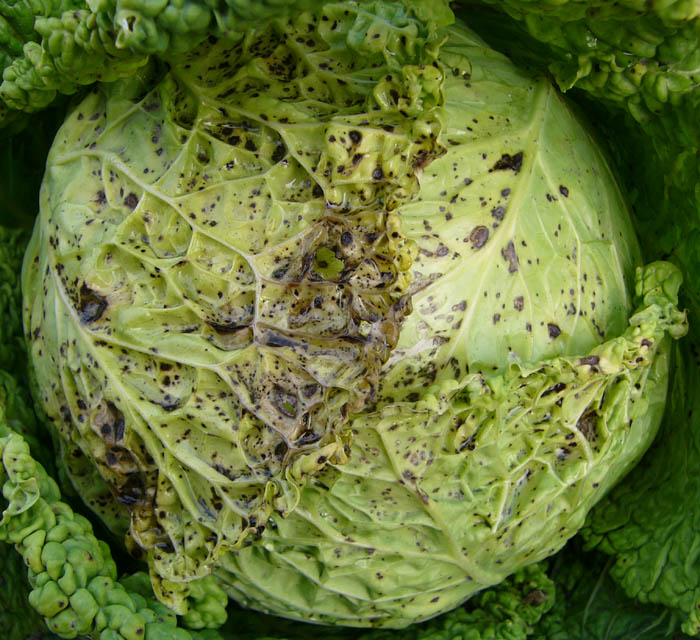
- Turnip yellow mosaic virus on cabbage, found in Bělidla, Olomouc, Moravia, Czech Republic

Virus classification
- (unranked): Virus
- Realm: Riboviria
- Kingdom: Orthornavirae
- Phylum: Kitrinoviricota
- Class: Alsuviricetes
- Order: Tymovirales
- Family: Tymoviridae
- Genus: Tymovirus
- Species: Tymovirus brassicae

Synonyms
- Brassicavirus octahedron; Cardamine yellow mosaic virus

= Turnip yellow mosaic virus =

Species of virus

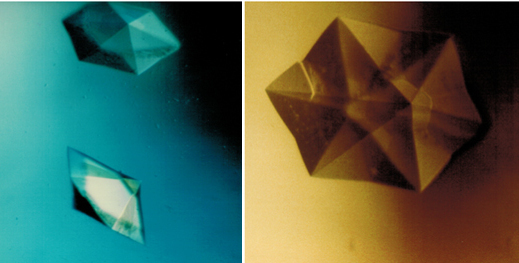
Turnip yellow mosaic virus crystals grown on Earth (left) and in outer space under microgravity conditions (right).

Turnip yellow mosaic virus (TYMV) is an isometric Tymovirus of the family Tymoviridae. Its host range is confined almost entirely to plants in the genus Brassica in western Europe, which includes cabbages, cauliflower and broccoli. Infection causes bright yellow mosaic disease showing vein clearing and mottling of plant tissues.

== Transmission ==
It is transmitted by sap as well as a host of insect vectors. The most prominent of these are in the Phyllotreta and Psylliodes genera of flea beetles, although Phaedon cochleariae and its larva have also been known to help spread this virus. The larva lose their ability to transmit the disease once they reach the pupal stage, suggesting a mechanical infection process.
