= Cavemovirus =

Virus classification
- (unranked): Virus
- Realm: Riboviria
- Kingdom: Pararnavirae
- Phylum: Artverviricota
- Class: Revtraviricetes
- Order: Ortervirales
- Family: Caulimoviridae
- Genus: Cavemovirus

Genus of viruses

Cavemovirus is a genus of viruses, in the family Caulimoviridae order Ortervirales. Plants serve as natural hosts. There are three species in this genus. Diseases associated with this genus include: vein-clearing or banding mosaic.

== Taxonomy ==
The genus contains the following species, listed by scientific name and followed by the exemplar virus of the species:

- Cavemovirus collusipomeae, Sweet potato collusive virus
- Cavemovirus deltaepiphylli, Epiphyllum virus 4
- Cavemovirus venamanihotis, Cassava vein mosaic virus

== Structure ==
Viruses in Cavemovirus are non-enveloped, with icosahedral geometries, and T=7 symmetry. The diameter is around 50 nm. Genomes are circular and non-segmented. The genome codes for 5 proteins.

Genus	Structure	Symmetry	Capsid	Genomic arrangement	Genomic segmentation
Cavemovirus	Icosahedral	T=7	Non-enveloped	Circular	Monopartite

== Life cycle ==
Viral replication is nuclear/cytoplasmic. Replication follows the dsDNA (RT) replication model. dsDNA (RT) transcription is the method of transcription. The virus exits the host cell by nuclear pore export, and tubule-guided viral movement. Plants serve as the natural host. The virus is transmitted via a vector (aphid insects). Transmission routes are mechanical.

Genus	Host details	Tissue tropism	Entry details	Release details	Replication site	Assembly site	Transmission
Cavemovirus	Plants	None	Viral movement; mechanical inoculation	Viral movement	Nucleus	Cytoplasm	Mechanical inoculation: aphids
