= Betasatellite =

Virus classification
- Informal group: Subviral agents
- Informal group: Satellite nucleic acids
- Family: Tolecusatellitidae
- Genus: Betasatellite

Species
- See text

Genus of viruses

Betasatellite is a genus of satellite nucleic acids in the family Tolecusatellitidae. The genus contains 120 species. They are small, circular, single-stranded DNA molecules that rely on helper viruses like begomoviruses for replication, movement, and encapsidation. These satellites encode a multifunctional protein known as βC1, which is approximately 13.5 kDa in size and plays a crucial role in the suppression of host plant defense responses, contributing to the severity of diseases caused by the associated viruses.

== Name ==
The name Betasatellite is a combination of Beta, because they used to be referred to as DNA-β to distinguish them from DNA-B of begomoviruses, and satellite, the fact that it is a satellite.

== Taxonomy ==
The genus contains the following species:

- Betasatellite abelmoschusinvolutionis
- Betasatellite abelmoschusmusiviflavi
- Betasatellite abelmoschusomanense
- Betasatellite agerabueaense
- Betasatellite ageracameroonense
- Betasatellite ageraflavi
- Betasatellite ageraflavichinaense
- Betasatellite ageraflavinvolutionis
- Betasatellite ageraflavisrilankaense
- Betasatellite alternantherae
- Betasatellite andrographis
- Betasatellite capsi
- Betasatellite capsijaunpurense
- Betasatellite capsisrilankaense
- Betasatellite cardiospermi
- Betasatellite caricachinaense
- Betasatellite caricae
- Betasatellite caricagandhinagarense
- Betasatellite caricaindianense
- Betasatellite caricaindianensesecundi
- Betasatellite codiaei
- Betasatellite codiaeumflavi
- Betasatellite emiliae
- Betasatellite emiliafujianense
- Betasatellite erectitis
- Betasatellite eupatorii
- Betasatellite eupatoriumflavi
- Betasatellite gossypibahraichense
- Betasatellite gossypibangalorenseprimi
- Betasatellite gossypibangalorensequarti
- Betasatellite gossypibangalorensesecundi
- Betasatellite gossypibangalorensetertii
- Betasatellite gossypiburkinafasoense
- Betasatellite gossypigeziraense
- Betasatellite gossypikashmirense
- Betasatellite gossypimultanense
- Betasatellite gossypitandojamense
- Betasatellite hedyotis
- Betasatellite hibisci
- Betasatellite hibiscusvenae
- Betasatellite ioniceravenaflavi
- Betasatellite ioniceravenaibarakiense
- Betasatellite ioniceravenamusiviflavi
- Betasatellite ioniceravenanaraense
- Betasatellite leucatis
- Betasatellite linderniae
- Betasatellite ludwigiae
- Betasatellite ludwigiaprimi
- Betasatellite ludwigiasecundi
- Betasatellite ludwigiatertii
- Betasatellite malvastri
- Betasatellite malvastrumcambodiaense
- Betasatellite malvastrumflavi
- Betasatellite malvastrumyunnanenseprimi
- Betasatellite malvastrumyunnanensesecundi
- Betasatellite mirabilis
- Betasatellite momordicae
- Betasatellite nicotianachlorosis
- Betasatellite nicotianae
- Betasatellite nicotianajapanense
- Betasatellite nicotianapatnaense
- Betasatellite nicotianasheikhupuraense
- Betasatellite nicotianayunnanense
- Betasatellite nicotianinvolutionis
- Betasatellite phaseoli
- Betasatellite pisi
- Betasatellite raphani
- Betasatellite rhynchosiae
- Betasatellite rosae
- Betasatellite sidabarrackporense
- Betasatellite sidae
- Betasatellite sidamaduraiense
- Betasatellite sidamusivi
- Betasatellite sidavietnamenseprimo
- Betasatellite sidavietnamensesecundi
- Betasatellite siegesbeckiae
- Betasatellite siegesbeckiaguangxiense
- Betasatellite siegesbeckiasecundi
- Betasatellite solani
- Betasatellite solanibangalorense
- Betasatellite solanibangalorensesecundi
- Betasatellite solanibangladeshense
- Betasatellite solanibundiense
- Betasatellite solanichinaense
- Betasatellite solaniflavuschinaense
- Betasatellite solaniflavushandongense
- Betasatellite solaniflavusparvi
- Betasatellite solaniflavusthailandense
- Betasatellite solaniflavusvietnamense
- Betasatellite solaniflavusyunnanense
- Betasatellite solanighanaenseprimi
- Betasatellite solanighanaensesecundi
- Betasatellite solanighandinagarense
- Betasatellite solanihajipurense
- Betasatellite solanijavaense
- Betasatellite solanijoydebpurense
- Betasatellite solanijoydebpurensesecundi
- Betasatellite solanikarnatakaense
- Betasatellite solanilagunaense
- Betasatellite solanilaosense
- Betasatellite solanilucknowense
- Betasatellite solanimalaysiaense
- Betasatellite solanindianense
- Betasatellite solaninepalense
- Betasatellite solanipakistanense
- Betasatellite solanipanipatense
- Betasatellite solanipatnaense
- Betasatellite solaniphilippinense
- Betasatellite solanipunense
- Betasatellite solaniranchiense
- Betasatellite solanisecundi
- Betasatellite solanisrilankaense
- Betasatellite solanitogoense
- Betasatellite solaniyemenense
- Betasatellite trigonellae
- Betasatellite vernoniae
- Betasatellite verrnoniaflavi
- Betasatellite verrnoniaflavusfujianense
- Betasatellite vignae
- Betasatellite zinniae
