= Single-stranded RNA virus =

Single-stranded RNA virus refers to RNA viruses with single-stranded RNA genomes. There are two kinds:

- Negative-sense single-stranded RNA virus
- Positive-sense single-stranded RNA virus

== See also ==
- Double-stranded RNA viruses
- DNA virus
