= Cassava vein mosaic virus =

Virus classification
- (unranked): Virus
- Realm: Riboviria
- Kingdom: Pararnavirae
- Phylum: Artverviricota
- Class: Revtraviricetes
- Order: Ortervirales
- Family: Caulimoviridae
- Genus: Cavemovirus
- Species: Cavemovirus venamanihotis

Species of virus

Cassava vein mosaic virus (CsVMV) is a plant pathogenic virus of the family Caulimoviridae.
