= Macluravirus =

Virus classification
- (unranked): Virus
- Realm: Riboviria
- Kingdom: Orthornavirae
- Phylum: Pisuviricota
- Class: Stelpaviricetes
- Order: Patatavirales
- Family: Potyviridae
- Genus: Macluravirus

Genus of viruses

Macluravirus is a genus of viruses, in the family Potyviridae. Plants serve as natural hosts. There are 12 species in this genus.

== Description ==
Macluravirus is characterised by its flexuous filamentous particles, inclusion bodies in infected plant cells and a polyprotein genome strategy.

Unlike the other genera it is transmitted by insects. It also has shorter particles (650–660 nm in length). The genomes are monopartite. The name is derived from member species Maclura mosaic virus.

== History ==
The genus was proposed at the ICTV meeting in San Diego in 1998, and subsequently ratified.

== Structure ==
Viruses in Macluravirus are non-enveloped, with flexuous and Filamentous geometries. The diameter is around 12–15 nm, with a length of 650–660 nm. Genomes are linear and non-segmented, bipartite, around 8.0kb in length. Symmetry helical. Presence of characteristic inclusion bodies within infected plant cells.

Genus	Structure	Symmetry	Capsid	Genomic arrangement	Genomic segmentation
Macluravirus	Filamentous		Non-enveloped	Linear	Segmented

== Life cycle ==
Viral replication is cytoplasmic. Entry into the host cell is achieved by penetration into the host cell. Replication follows the positive stranded RNA virus replication model. Positive stranded RNA virus transcription is the method of transcription. The virus exits the host cell by tubule-guided viral movement. Plants serve as the natural host. The virus is transmitted via a vector (insects). Transmission routes are vector and mechanical.

Genus	Host details	Tissue tropism	Entry details	Release details	Replication site	Assembly site	Transmission
Macluravirus	Plants	None	Viral movement; mechanical inoculation	Viral movement	Cytoplasm	Cytoplasm	Mechanical inoculation: aphids

== Taxonomy ==
The genus contains the following species, listed by scientific name and followed by the exemplar virus of the species:

- Macluravirus alipiniatessallati, Alpinia oxyphylla mosaic virus
- Macluravirus alpiniae, Alpinia mosaic virus
- Macluravirus amomi, Tsaoko stripe mosaic virus
- Macluravirus amomulineae, Large cardamon chirke virus
- Macluravirus cardamomi, Cardamom mosaic virus
- Macluravirus dioscoreachinense, Chinese yam necrotic mosaic virus
- Macluravirus dioscoreaflavinecrosis, Yam chlorotic necrosis virus
- Macluravirus dioscoreaflavitessellati, Yam chlorotic mosaic virus
- Macluravirus maclurae, Maclura mosaic virus
- Macluravirus narcissi, Narcissus latent virus
- Macluravirus rumicis, Broad-leafed dock virus A
- Macluravirus scolymus, Artichoke latent virus
