= Tolecusatellitidae =

Virus classification
- Informal group: Subviral agents
- Informal group: Satellite nucleic acids
- Family: Tolecusatellitidae

Genera
- Betasatellite; Deltasatellite

Family of satellites

Tolecusatellitidae is a family of DNA satellite nucleic acids that depend on the presence of another virus (a helper virus) to replicate their genomes. As such, they have minimal genomes with very low genomic redundancy. The genome is a single circular DNA molecule. The family contains two genera.

== Name ==
The name Tolecusatellitidae is a combination of Tolecu, from the first DNA satellite shown to be associated with Tomato leaf curl virus and satellite, the fact that it is a satellite.
