= Hordeivirus =

Virus classification
- (unranked): Virus
- Realm: Riboviria
- Kingdom: Orthornavirae
- Phylum: Kitrinoviricota
- Class: Alsuviricetes
- Order: Martellivirales
- Family: Virgaviridae
- Genus: Hordeivirus

Genus of viruses

Hordeivirus is a genus of viruses, in the family Virgaviridae. Plants serve as natural hosts. There are four species in this genus.

== Taxonomy ==
The following species are assigned to the genus, listed by scientific name and followed by their common names:

- Hordeivirus anthoxanthi, Anthoxanthum latent blanching virus (ALBV) (Hosts Anthoxanthum odoratum.)
- Hordeivirus hordei, Barley stripe mosaic virus (BSMV)
- Hordeivirus lychnis, Lychnis ringspot virus (LRSV) (Hosts Silene divaricata/Lychnis divaricata, Mentha longifolia, Nicotiana benthamiana, several families of dicots, not legumes or cereals.)
- Hordeivirus poae, Poa semilatent virus (PSLV) (Hosts Elymus trachycaulus, Poa palustris, several tribes of the Poaceae, barley, wheat, oat, other true cereals - no dicots. Thought to not be seed transmitted.)

== Structure ==
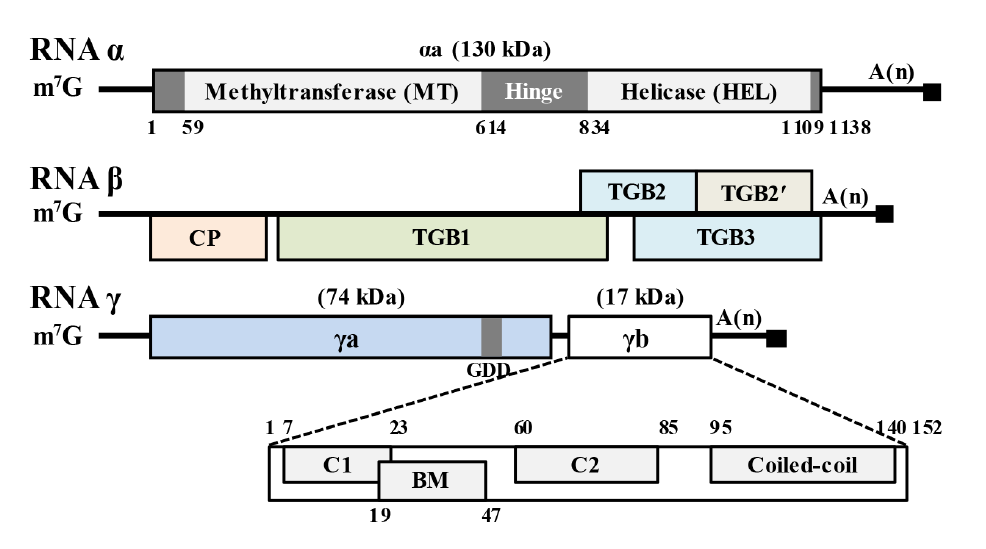
Barley stripe mosaic virus (BSMV) genome organization with functional regions of the γb protein highlighted

Viruses in the genus Hordeivirus are non-enveloped, with rod-shaped geometries. The diameter is around 20-25 nm, with a length of 20-25 nm. Genomes are linear and segmented, tripartite or quadripartite, around 3.3kb in length. The earliest research on Hordeiviruses has been done on BSMV, and RNA sequencing shows BSMV's guide RNAs encode for seven major proteins, and suggest that this is true for the entire genus.

Genus	Structure	Symmetry	Capsid	Genomic arrangement	Genomic segmentation
Hordeivirus	Rod-shaped	Helical	Non-enveloped	Linear	Segmented

== Life cycle ==
Viral replication is cytoplasmic, and is lysogenic. Entry into the host cell is achieved by penetration into the host cell. Replication follows the positive stranded RNA virus replication model. Positive stranded RNA virus transcription is the method of transcription. Translation takes place by leaky scanning. The virus exits the host cell by tripartite non-tubule guided viral movement. Plants serve as the natural host. Transmission routes are seed borne.

Genus	Host details	Tissue tropism	Entry details	Release details	Replication site	Assembly site	Transmission
Hordeivirus	Plants	None	Unknown	Viral movement	Cytoplasm	Cytoplasm	Mechanical: contact; seed

== Hosts ==
Monocots, and dicots including Chenopodium spp.
