= Bymovirus =

Virus classification
- (unranked): Virus
- Realm: Riboviria
- Kingdom: Orthornavirae
- Phylum: Pisuviricota
- Class: Stelpaviricetes
- Order: Patatavirales
- Family: Potyviridae
- Genus: Bymovirus

Genus of viruses

Bymovirus is a genus of viruses, in the family Potyviridae. Plants serve as natural hosts. There are six species in this genus.

== Taxonomy ==
The genus contains the following species, listed by scientific name and followed by the exemplar virus of the species:

- Bymovirus avenae, Oat mosaic virus
- Bymovirus hordei, Barley mild mosaic virus
- Bymovirus hordeiluteum, Barley yellow mosaic virus
- Bymovirus oryzae, Rice necrosis mosaic virus
- Bymovirus tritici, Wheat spindle streak mosaic virus
- Bymovirus triticitessellati, Wheat yellow mosaic virus

== Structure ==
Viruses in Bymovirus are non-enveloped, with flexuous and Filamentous geometries. The diameter is around 12-15 nm, with a length of 500-600 and 200-300 nm. Genomes are linear and bipartite, around 23.5-3.8kb in length.

Genus	Structure	Symmetry	Capsid	Genomic arrangement	Genomic segmentation
Bymovirus	Filamentous		Non-enveloped	Linear	Segmented

== Life cycle ==
Viral replication is cytoplasmic. Entry into the host cell is achieved by penetration into the host cell. Replication follows the positive stranded RNA virus replication model. Positive stranded RNA virus transcription is the method of transcription. The virus exits the host cell by tubule-guided viral movement. Plants serve as the natural host. The virus is transmitted via a vector (fungus; plasmodiophorales). Transmission routes are vector, mechanical, and oral.

Genus	Host details	Tissue tropism	Entry details	Release details	Replication site	Assembly site	Transmission
Bymovirus	Plants	None	Viral movement; mechanical inoculation	Viral movement	Cytoplasm	Cytoplasm	Mechanical inoculation: fungus (Plasmodiophorales)
