= Wheat spindle streak mosaic virus =

Virus classification
- (unranked): Virus
- Realm: Riboviria
- Kingdom: Orthornavirae
- Phylum: Pisuviricota
- Class: Stelpaviricetes
- Order: Patatavirales
- Family: Potyviridae
- Genus: Bymovirus
- Species: Bymovirus tritici

Species of virus

Wheat spindle streak mosaic virus (WSSMV) is a plant pathogenic virus of the family Potyviridae.
