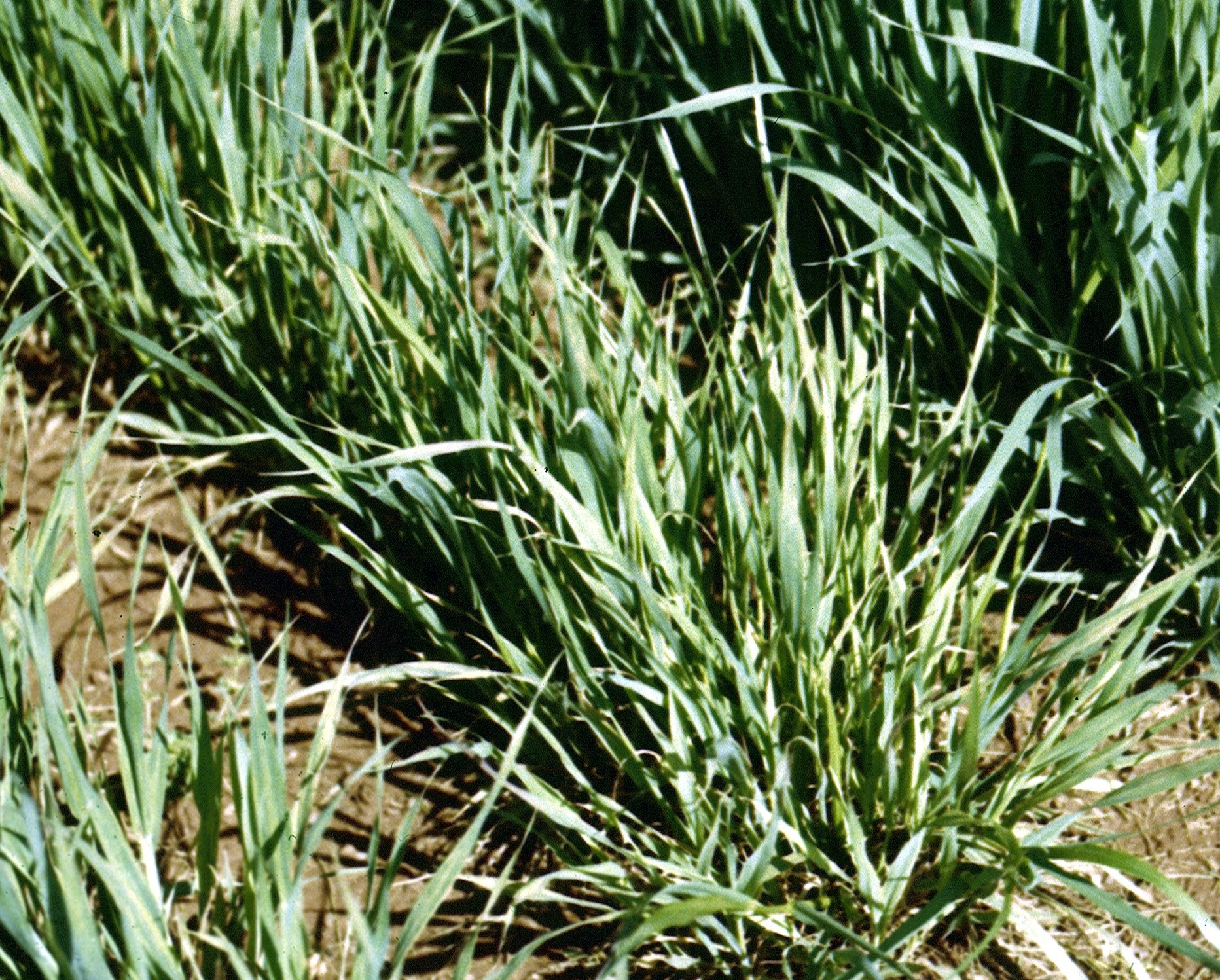
- Symptoms of Oat mosaic virus

Virus classification
- (unranked): Virus
- Realm: Riboviria
- Kingdom: Orthornavirae
- Phylum: Pisuviricota
- Class: Stelpaviricetes
- Order: Patatavirales
- Family: Potyviridae
- Genus: Bymovirus
- Species: Bymovirus avenae

Synonyms
- Soil-borne oat mosaic virus

= Oat mosaic virus =

Species of virus

Oat mosaic virus (OMV) is a plant pathogenic virus of the family Potyviridae.
