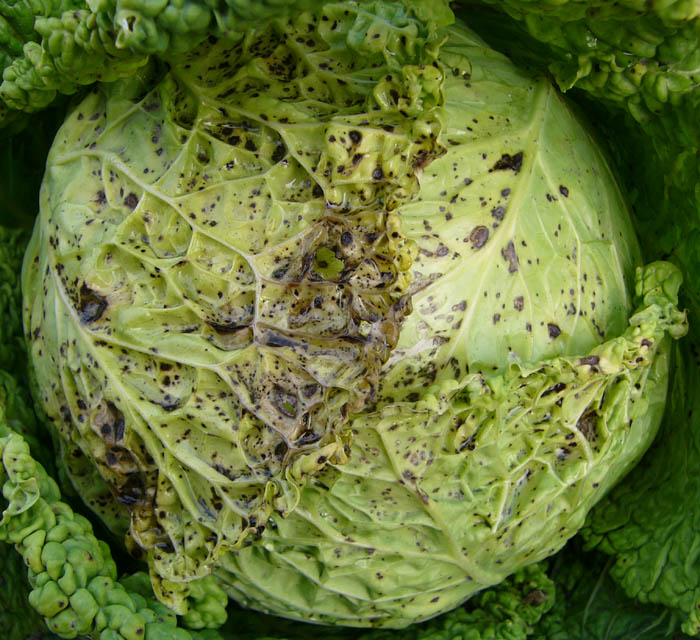
- Turnip yellow mosaic virus on cabbage, found in Bělidla, Olomouc, Moravia, Czech Republic

Virus classification
- (unranked): Virus
- Realm: Riboviria
- Kingdom: Orthornavirae
- Phylum: Kitrinoviricota
- Class: Alsuviricetes
- Order: Tymovirales
- Family: Tymoviridae
- Genus: Tymovirus

= Tymovirus =

Genus of viruses

Tymovirus is a genus of viruses in the order Tymovirales, in the family Tymoviridae. Plants serve as natural hosts. There are 30 species in this genus.

== Taxonomy ==
The genus contains the following species, listed by scientific name and followed by the exemplar virus of the species:

- Tymovirus abelmoschi, Okra mosaic virus
- Tymovirus anagyris, Anagyris vein yellowing virus
- Tymovirus arachidis, Peanut yellow mosaic virus
- Tymovirus belladonnae, Belladonna mottle virus
- Tymovirus brassicae, Turnip yellow mosaic virus
- Tymovirus calopogonii, Calopogonium yellow vein virus
- Tymovirus chayotis, Chayote mosaic virus
- Tymovirus chiltepini, Chiltepin yellow mosaic virus
- Tymovirus clitoriae, Clitoria yellow vein virus
- Tymovirus cucumis, Wild cucumber mosaic virus
- Tymovirus desmodii, Desmodium yellow mottle virus
- Tymovirus dulcamarae, Dulcamara mottle virus
- Tymovirus erysimi, Erysimum latent virus
- Tymovirus kennedyae, Kennedya yellow mosaic virus
- Tymovirus latandigenum, Andean potato latent virus
- Tymovirus lycopersici, Tomato blistering mosaic tymovirus
- Tymovirus melongenae, Eggplant mosaic virus
- Tymovirus melonis, Melon rugose mosaic virus
- Tymovirus mosandigenum, Andean potato mild mosaic virus
- Tymovirus naranjillae, Naranjilla chlorotic mosaic virus
- Tymovirus nemesiae, Nemesia ring necrosis virus
- Tymovirus ononis, Ononis yellow mosaic virus
- Tymovirus passiflorae, Passion fruit yellow mosaic virus
- Tymovirus petuniae, Petunia vein banding virus
- Tymovirus physalis, Physalis mottle virus
- Tymovirus plantagonis, Plantago mottle virus
- Tymovirus quitoense, Naranjilla mild mosaic virus
- Tymovirus scrophulariae, Scrophularia mottle virus
- Tymovirus theobromatis, Cacao yellow mosaic virus
- Tymovirus voandzeiae, Voandzeia necrotic mosaic virus

== Structure ==
Viruses in Tymovirus are non-enveloped, with icosahedral and isometric geometries, and T=3 symmetry. The diameter is around 30 nm. Genomes are linear, around 6.3kb in length.

Genus	Structure	Symmetry	Capsid	Genomic arrangement	Genomic segmentation
Tymovirus	Icosahedral	T=3	Non-enveloped	Linear	Monopartite

== Life cycle ==
Viral replication is cytoplasmic and lysogenic. Entry into the host cell is achieved by penetration into the host cell. Replication follows the positive stranded RNA virus replication model. Positive stranded RNA virus transcription is the method of transcription. Translation takes place by leaky scanning. The virus exits the host cell by monopartite non-tubule guided viral movement. Plants serve as the natural host. The virus is transmitted via a vector (insects). Transmission routes are vector and mechanical.

Genus	Host details	Tissue tropism	Entry details	Release details	Replication site	Assembly site	Transmission
Tymovirus	Plants	None	Viral movement; mechanical inoculation	Viral movement	Cytoplasm	Cytoplasm	Mechanical: beetles; sap
