= Barley stripe mosaic virus =

Virus classification
- (unranked): Virus
- Realm: Riboviria
- Kingdom: Orthornavirae
- Phylum: Kitrinoviricota
- Class: Alsuviricetes
- Order: Martellivirales
- Family: Virgaviridae
- Genus: Hordeivirus
- Species: Hordeivirus hordei

Species of virus

Barley stripe mosaic virus (BSMV), of genus Hordevirus, is an RNA viral plant pathogen whose main hosts are barley and wheat. The common symptoms for BSMV are yellow streaks or spots, mosaic, leaves and stunted growth. It is spread primarily through infected seed and can be spread through mechanical transfer of an infected and uninfected host. Plants infected with BSMV are more symptomatic in warmer temperatures. Resistant hosts and sterilization of equipment are the best ways to control the spread of the pathogen. BSMV has been known to reduce the yields of barley by up to 25%, but is not a major problem because of resistant varieties of barley.

== Host and symptoms ==
Barley stripe mosaic virus has a narrow host range. Horedum vulgare, commonly known as barley, is the main host for the virus. BSMV can also infect wheat, Triticum aestivum. Very rarely, BSMV can be seen in wild oats along with rye, maize, rice, sorghum, and millet. In experimental conditions, spinach, beetroot, and tobacco were able to be infected. Enzyme-linked immunosorbent assay (ELISA) is a useful tool that can differentiate between similar strains of barley stripe mosaic virus and provide quantitative results. ELISA works by using antibodies that are specific for a particular virus and the antibody-antigen interaction is mediated by a solid surface, which is usually a polystyrene multiwell plate.

Common symptoms of BSMV are yellow to white mottling, spotting and streaking, necrosis and severe mosaic on leaves. Stunting is also very common. Symptoms can vary based on virus strain, host plant and environmental conditions. Symptoms are more prevalent in warm temperatures. Plants grown from infected seeds are severely stunted or could even die before emergence in very susceptible hosts varieties. Experimentally infected plants took 4–5 days for chlorotic symptoms to appear.

Symptoms for BSMV are similar to barley stripe disease, a fungal disease caused by Pyrenophora graminea, though the two are caused by completely different pathogens and should be treated differently.

== Disease cycle ==
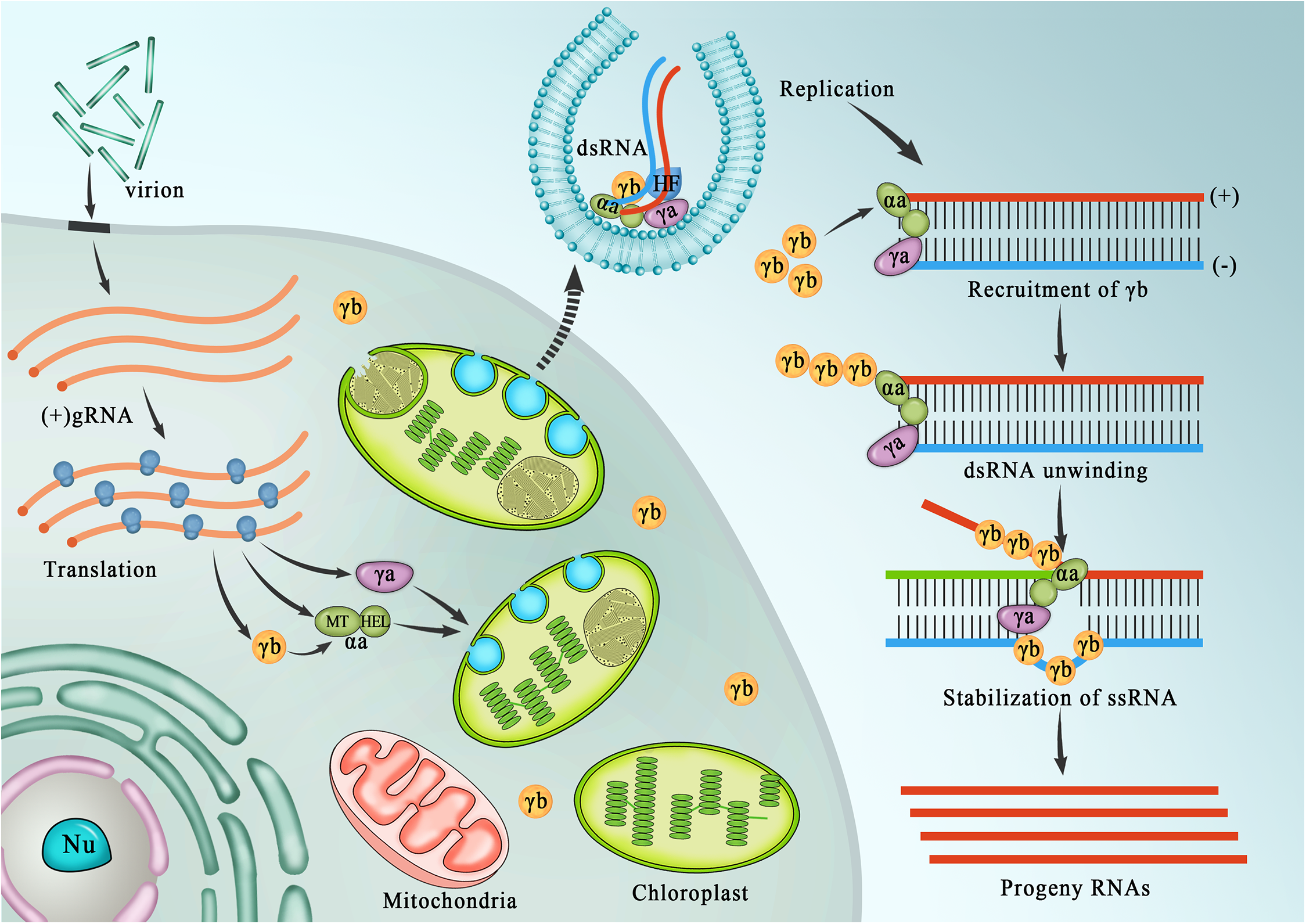
Replication of barley stripe mosaic virus in the chloroplast of the plant cell

Barley stripe mosaic virus is not known to be transmitted through vectors. Rather, BSMV is confined to only plant tissues, of which it targets chloroplasts and nuclei within the mesophyll and epidermal cells. The virus can be indirectly spread to other plants because the virus can also aggregate in the seeds. Likewise, BSMV can be transmitted via mechanical inoculation to the plant.

The main way the virus perpetuates itself is growth from an infected seed. The infection can persists for years inside the seed.

== Environment ==
Unlike many viruses, there are no known insect vectors to spread the disease. Rather, BSMV relies on parent to offspring transmission.

Temperature at which the infected plant is grown is critical to spreading and developing the disease. At higher temperatures, the symptoms are more severe. According to one study, when infected host plants were held at 7 °C, they took approximately 30 days to develop symptoms, and never were able to infect other potential hosts. However, at higher temperatures of 12-18 °C symptoms developed in 7–8 days and the virus was transmissible. However, it is still important to note that severity of symptoms don't always correlate with the amount of the virus present. Another found that the levels of virus present remained relatively constant over a range of 13 °C-25 °C and that the amount of virus present was related only to the age of the hosts and length of time that they were infected.

Light intensity may also have an effect on the development of the disease symptoms. A study showed that heavily shaded infected plants showed little to no symptoms after 11 days when compared to non-shaded infected plants.

A factor that affects the spread and severity of the virus is the species and variety of host, as some are more susceptible than others. For example, the barley variety CM67 is very susceptible. It has a much higher transmission rate than other varieties, and if symptoms are severe enough due to weather conditions, this variety can even be sterile.

Another factor that affects the spread of the disease is the gametes bred to produce the offspring. One study found that about 10% of seeds produced from an infected harvest also contain the virus. One belief was that the virus could be spread to offspring by infected pollen grains, and because of this it was believed that it could potentially spread over long distances. However, an infected ovule is a more important factor for the spread of this disease. The disease is more likely to spread when an infected ovule produces progeny with infected pollen, with a 70% transmission rate. When an infected ovule is pollinated by an uninfected pollen there is only about a 66% transmission rate. In an uninfected ovule that is pollinated by infected pollen there is only about a 3% transmission rate to the offspring.

== Management ==
The best way to control the virus is to plant with clean seed, since the virus is spread through infected seed. BMSV is also spread through mechanical transfer of the virus; reducing handling and movement through infected areas will help contain the disease. Sterilization of all tools and machinery, specifically irrigation systems, used in fields will reduce the spread of BMSV. Quaternary ammonium salts and hydrogen dioxides are two common commercial products used for sterilization of horticulture tools and machinery. Removal of infected plants can help reduce the spread of the virus. In fields where the disease has gone unnoticed, allowing the virus to spread, it is important to prevent spread to other fields and prevent seeds from infected plants from being planted the next year, as they too are likely infected with virus.

Chemical control and biological control are not known to exist for this virus.

Host plant resistance is another form of management. Barley hosts differ in their susceptibility to BSMV. There are many types of resistant barley varieties including: Traill, Moreval, Modjo-1, Morex, Modjo, and CI 4197.

== Importance ==
One study has found that the BSMV resistance gene shows Mendelian genetics and has shown to be dominant by complete mapping of the Bsr1 Barley Stripe Moasic Virus Resistance Gene in Brachypodium distachyon.

Barley Stripe Mosaic Virus is one of the very few viruses that is transmitted through seeds for small grain cereals. BSMV mostly affects regions in Montana and North Dakota and have reduced yields by up to 25%.

Shortly after its discovery, BSMV was found to be present in 97% of barley fields in North Dakota in 1954. To combat this, in 1957 Kansas, Montana, and North Dakota launched a seed certification program to obtain BSMV free barley seeds. The control program involved assaying seedlings for presence of the virus, and only seed foundations determined to be BSMV-free were used to produce certified BSMV-free seeds to be sold commercially. By 1972 a zero tolerance was placed on all certified seeds in Montana which led to a dramatic decline in yield loss due to BSMV. Similarly, in 1971 BSMV was eliminated in barley seeds in North Dakota.

However, despite not being a factor in crop production anymore, BSMV is still important in research, as various studies have shown that it can be used to study gene function via gene silencing in oat, wheat, and Brachypodium distachyon (a grass that is a model monocot for genetics research). One example of an accomplishment of BSMV gene silencing has been used to detect the location of powdery mildew resistance genes in barley. BSMV was the first virus-induced gene silencer found in monocots, which is important because many crops such as corn, rice, rye, sugarcane, sorghum, and the hosts of BSMV are monocots. This allows for a way to study the genes in monocots and for a way to compare the findings to those of the virus-induced gene silencing in dicots.
