= Poacevirus =

Virus classification
- (unranked): Virus
- Realm: Riboviria
- Kingdom: Orthornavirae
- Phylum: Pisuviricota
- Class: Stelpaviricetes
- Order: Patatavirales
- Family: Potyviridae
- Genus: Poacevirus

Genus of viruses

Poacevirus is a genus of viruses, in the family Potyviridae. Poaceae plants serve as natural hosts. There are four species in this genus.

== Taxonomy ==
The genus contains the following species, listed by scientific name and followed by the exemplar virus of the species:

- Poacevirus avenae, Wild oat poacevirus 1
- Poacevirus caladeniae, Caladenia virus A
- Poacevirus sacchari, Sugarcane streak mosaic virus
- Poacevirus tritici, Triticum mosaic virus

== Structure ==
Viruses in Poacevirus are non-enveloped, with flexuous and filamentous geometries. The diameter is around 12-15 nm, with a length of 680-750 nm. Genomes are linear and non-segmented, around 9.7-10.3kb in length.

| Genus | Structure | Symmetry | Capsid | Genomic arrangement | Genomic segmentation |
|---|---|---|---|---|---|
| Poacevirus | Filamentous | | Non-enveloped | Linear | Monopartite |

== Life cycle ==
Viral replication is cytoplasmic. Entry into the host cell is achieved by penetration into the host cell. Replication follows the positive stranded RNA virus replication model. Positive stranded RNA virus transcription is the method of transcription. The virus exits the host cell by tubule-guided viral movement. Poaceae plants serve as the natural host. The virus is transmitted via a vector (wheat curl mite). Transmission routes are vector.

| Genus | Host details | Tissue tropism | Entry details | Release details | Replication site | Assembly site | Transmission |
|---|---|---|---|---|---|---|---|
| Poacevirus | Plants | None | Viral movement; mechanical inoculation | Viral movement | Cytoplasm | Cytoplasm | Mechanical inoculation: wheat curl mite |
