= Rymovirus =

Virus classification
- (unranked): Virus
- Realm: Riboviria
- Kingdom: Orthornavirae
- Phylum: Pisuviricota
- Class: Stelpaviricetes
- Order: Patatavirales
- Family: Potyviridae
- Genus: Rymovirus

Genus of viruses

Rymovirus is a genus of viruses, in the family Potyviridae. Plants serve as natural hosts. There are three species in this genus.

== Taxonomy ==
The genus contains the following species, listed by scientific name and followed by the exemplar virus of the species:

- Rymovirus agropyronis, Agropyron mosaic virus
- Rymovirus hordei, Hordeum mosaic virus
- Rymovirus lolii, Ryegrass mosaic virus

== Structure ==
Viruses in Rymovirus are non-enveloped, with flexuous and filamentous geometries. The diameter is around 11-15 nm, with a length of 200-300 nm. Genomes are linear and non-segmented, bipartite, around 9-10kb in length.

Genus	Structure	Symmetry	Capsid	Genomic arrangement	Genomic segmentation
Rymovirus	Filamentous		Non-enveloped	Linear	Segmented

== Life cycle ==
Viral replication is cytoplasmic. Entry into the host cell is achieved by penetration into the host cell. Replication follows the positive stranded RNA virus replication model. Positive stranded RNA virus transcription is the method of transcription. The virus exits the host cell by tubule-guided viral movement. Plants serve as the natural host. The virus is transmitted via a vector (mite). Transmission routes are vector and mechanical.

Genus	Host details	Tissue tropism	Entry details	Release details	Replication site	Assembly site	Transmission
Rymovirus	Plants	None	Viral movement; mechanical inoculation	Viral movement	Cytoplasm	Cytoplasm	Mechanical inoculation: mites
