= Ryegrass mosaic virus =

Virus classification
- (unranked): Virus
- Realm: Riboviria
- Kingdom: Orthornavirae
- Phylum: Pisuviricota
- Class: Stelpaviricetes
- Order: Patatavirales
- Family: Potyviridae
- Genus: Rymovirus
- Species: Rymovirus lolii

Species of virus

Ryegrass mosaic virus (RMV) is a virus in the genus Rymovirus. As the name suggests its hosts include ryegrass, but also other relatives in the family Poaceae. RMV's genome was sequenced in 2015.
