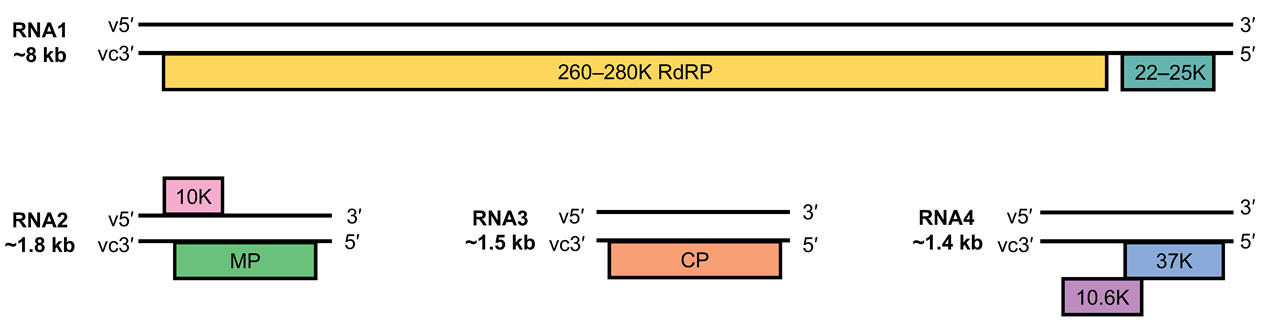
- (top) Electron micrograph of Citrus psorosis ophiovirus; (bottom) Mirafiori lettuce big-vein virus genome

Virus classification
- (unranked): Virus
- Realm: Riboviria
- Kingdom: Orthornavirae
- Phylum: Negarnaviricota
- Class: Milneviricetes
- Order: Serpentovirales
- Family: Aspiviridae
- Genus: Ophiovirus

Species
- See text

= Aspiviridae =

Ophiovirus

Family of viruses

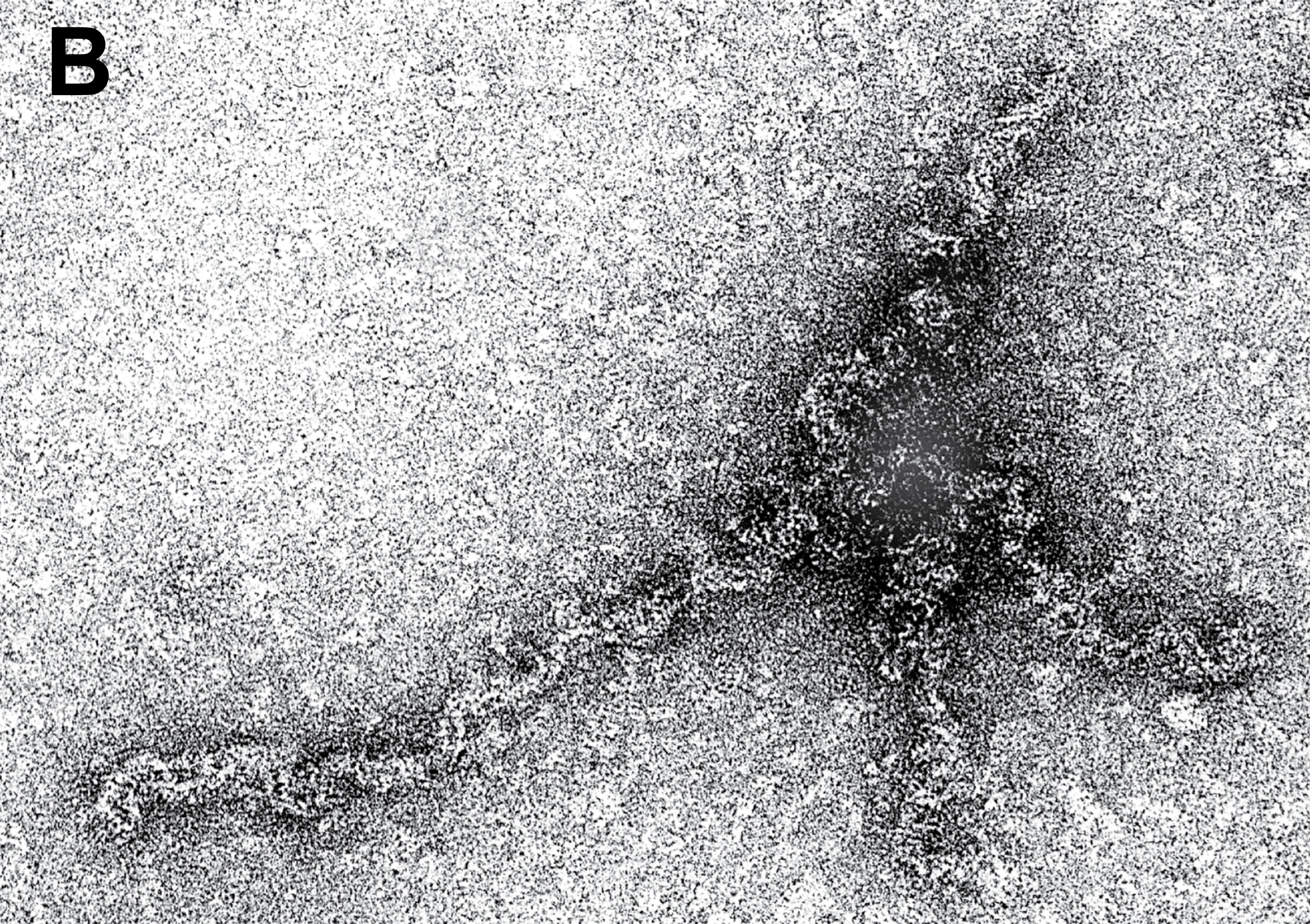
Collapsed form of the large Freesia sneak ophiovirus particle. Negative-contrast electron micrograph (uranyl acetate); bar: 100 nm.

Aspiviridae, formerly Ophioviridae, is a family of segmented negative-strand RNA viruses which infect plants. Member viruses are characterized by an elongated and highly filamentous and flexible nucleocapsid with helical symmetry. It is a monotypic taxon containing only one genus, Ophiovirus. Aspiviridae is also the only family in the order Serpentovirales, which in turn is the only order in the class Milneviricetes.

== History ==
The name Aspiviridae derives from the Latin aspis (snake or viper), referring to the shape, along with the suffix for a virus family -viridae. Ophiovirus derives from the Ancient Greek ophis, "snake", with –virus the suffix for a virus genus. Likewise, Serpentovirales is from "serpent" with -virales the suffix for a virus order. Milneviricetes is in honor of Robert G. Milne, the last author on the first paper describing ophioviruses.

== Virology ==
=== Structure ===
The protein capsid is non-enveloped and has a constant diameter of 1500–2500 nm and a width of 3 nm, or 9 nm. The capsids form kinked circles, which can collapse to form linear duplex structures, much like a spring.

=== Genome ===
Member viruses have segmented, negative-sense, single-stranded RNA genomes. The entire genome is 11000–12000 nucleotides long.

== Taxonomy ==
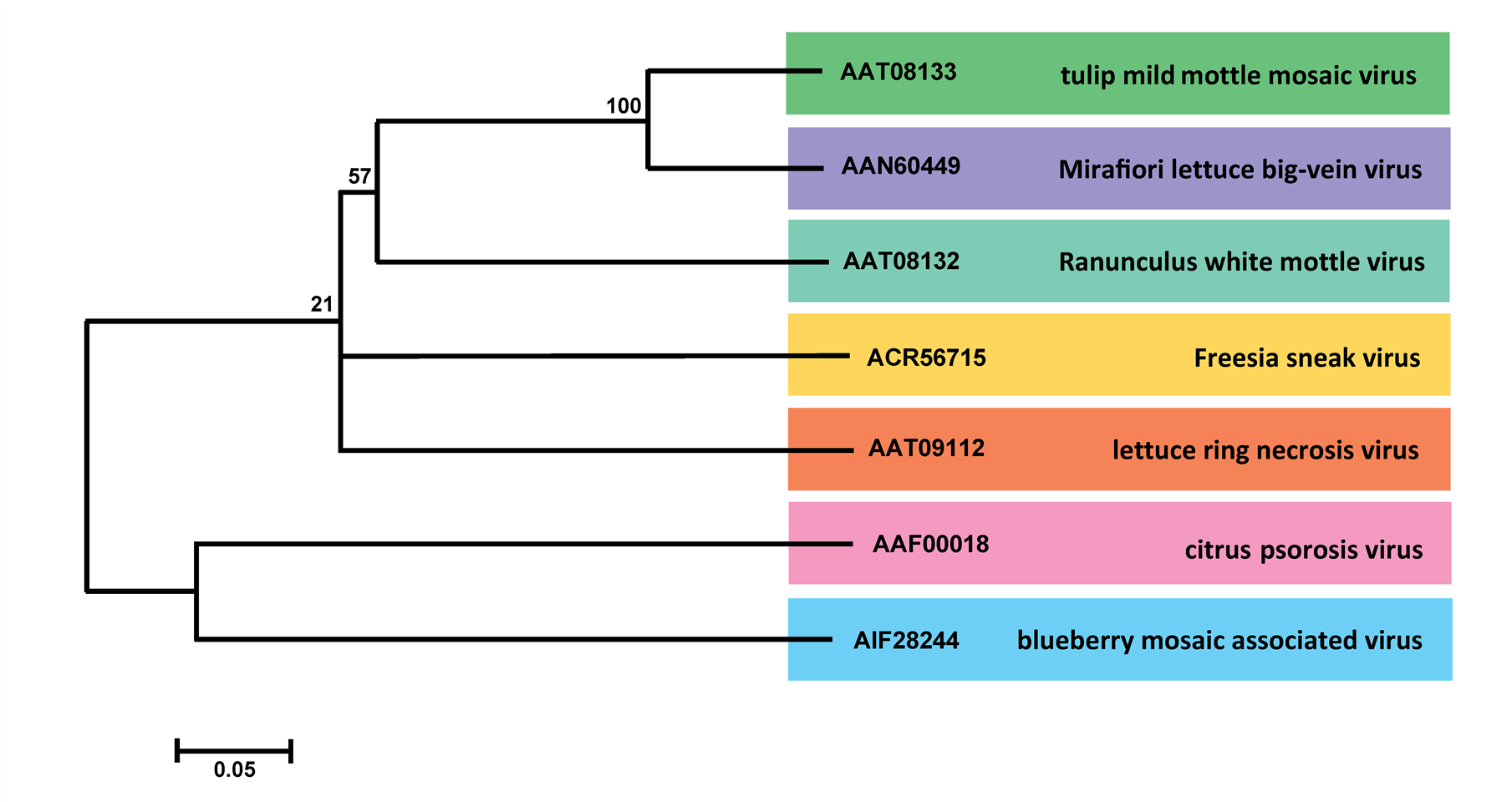
Aspiviridae phylogenetic tree

The family has one genus, Ophiovirus, which has eight recognized species. Members of both the family and the genus are referred to as ophioviruses. Ophiovirus contains the following species, listed by scientific name and followed by the exemplar virus of the species:

- Ophiovirus capsici, Pepper chlorosis associated virus
- Ophiovirus citri, Citrus psorosis virus
- Ophiovirus freesiae, Freesia sneak virus
- Ophiovirus lactucae, Lettuce ring necrosis virus
- Ophiovirus mirafioriense, Mirafiori lettuce big-vein virus
- Ophiovirus ranunculi, Ranunculus white mottle virus
- Ophiovirus tulipae, Tulip mild mottle mosaic virus
- Ophiovirus vaccinii, Blueberry mosaic associated virus
