= Marafivirus =

Virus classification
- (unranked): Virus
- Realm: Riboviria
- Kingdom: Orthornavirae
- Phylum: Kitrinoviricota
- Class: Alsuviricetes
- Order: Tymovirales
- Family: Tymoviridae
- Genus: Marafivirus

Genus of viruses

Marafivirus is a genus of viruses in the order Tymovirales, in the family Tymoviridae. Plants serve as natural hosts. There are 12 species in this genus.

== Taxonomy ==
The genus contains the following species, listed by scientific name and followed by the exemplar virus of the species:

- Marafivirus asteroides, Grapevine asteroid mosaic associated virus
- Marafivirus avenae, Oat blue dwarf virus
- Marafivirus citri, Citrus sudden death-associated virus
- Marafivirus cynodonis, Bermuda grass etched-line virus
- Marafivirus maydis, Maize rayado fino virus
- Marafivirus medicagonis, Alfalfa virus F
- Marafivirus nucipersicae, Nectarine marafivirus M
- Marafivirus oleae, Olive latent virus 3
- Marafivirus pruni, Peach marafivirus D
- Marafivirus rubi, Blackberry virus S
- Marafivirus sorghi, Sorghum almum marafivirus
- Marafivirus syrahense, Grapevine Syrah virus 1

== Structure ==
Viruses in Marafivirus are non-enveloped, with icosahedral and isometric geometries, and T=3 symmetry. The diameter is around 30 nm. Genomes are linear, around 6-7kb in length.

Genus	Structure	Symmetry	Capsid	Genomic arrangement	Genomic segmentation
Marafivirus	Icosahedral	T=3	Non-enveloped	Linear	Monopartite

== Life cycle ==
Entry into the host cell is achieved by penetration into the host cell. Replication follows the positive stranded RNA virus replication model. Positive stranded RNA virus transcription is the method of transcription. The virus exits the host cell by monopartite non-tubule guided viral movement. Plants serve as the natural host. The virus is transmitted via a vector (leafhoppers). Transmission routes are vector and mechanical.

Genus	Host details	Tissue tropism	Entry details	Release details	Replication site	Assembly site	Transmission
Marafivirus	Plants	None	Viral movement; mechanical inoculation	Viral movement	Cytoplasm	Cytoplasm	Mechanical inoculation: pseudococcid mealybugs; Mechanical inoculation: aphids
