= Agropyron mosaic virus =

Virus classification
- (unranked): Virus
- Realm: Riboviria
- Kingdom: Orthornavirae
- Phylum: Pisuviricota
- Class: Stelpaviricetes
- Order: Patatavirales
- Family: Potyviridae
- Genus: Rymovirus
- Species: Rymovirus agropyronis

Synonyms
- Agropyron green mosaic virus Agropyron streak mosaic virus Agropyron yellow mosaic virus Couch grass streak mosaic virus

Species of virus

Agropyron mosaic virus is a plant pathogenic virus of the family Potyviridae.
