= Tymoviridae =

Virus classification
- (unranked): Virus
- Realm: Riboviria
- Kingdom: Orthornavirae
- Phylum: Kitrinoviricota
- Class: Alsuviricetes
- Order: Tymovirales
- Family: Tymoviridae

Genera
- Maculavirus; Marafivirus; Tymovirus

Family of viruses

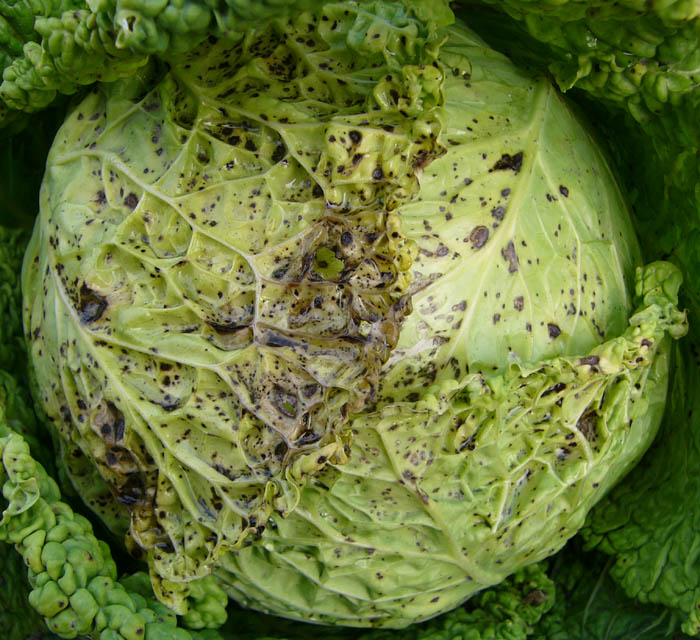
Turnip yellow mosaic virus on cabbage

Tymoviridae is a family of single-stranded positive sense RNA viruses in the order Tymovirales. Plants serve as natural hosts. The family has three genera.

== Taxonomy ==
The family includes the following three genera:

- Maculavirus
- Marafivirus
- Tymovirus

=== Proposed viruses ===
- Culex tymovirus
- Fig fleck-associated virus

== Virology ==
The virions are non-enveloped and isometric with a diameter of around 30 nm, with an icosahedral structure and a triangulation number T=3.

The linear genome is between of 6–7.5 kilobases in length and encodes three open reading frames. It is capped at the 5’ terminus. The 3’ terminus may have a tRNA-like structure or a polyA tract, depending upon the species. The genome is relatively cytosine rich.

Genus	Structure	Symmetry	Capsid	Genomic arrangement	Genomic segmentation
Maculavirus	Icosahedral	T=3	Non-enveloped	Linear	Monopartite
Marafivirus	Icosahedral	T=3	Non-enveloped	Linear	Monopartite
Tymovirus	Icosahedral	T=3	Non-enveloped	Linear	Monopartite

== Life cycle ==
Viral replication is cytoplasmic, and is lysogenic. Entry into the host cell is achieved by penetration into the host cell. Replication follows the positive stranded RNA virus replication model. Positive stranded RNA virus transcription is the method of transcription. Translation takes place by leaky scanning. The virus exits the host cell by monopartite non-tubule guided viral movement. Plants serve as the natural host. The virus is transmitted via a vector (insects). Transmission routes are vector and mechanical.

Genus	Host details	Tissue tropism	Entry details	Release details	Replication site	Assembly site	Transmission
Maculavirus	Plants	None	Viral movement; mechanical inoculation	Viral movement	Cytoplasm	Cytoplasm	Mechanical inoculation: pseudococcid mealybugs; Mechanical inoculation: aphids
Marafivirus	Plants	None	Viral movement; mechanical inoculation	Viral movement	Cytoplasm	Cytoplasm	Mechanical inoculation: pseudococcid mealybugs; Mechanical inoculation: aphids
Tymovirus	Plants	None	Viral movement; mechanical inoculation	Viral movement	Cytoplasm	Cytoplasm	Mechanical: beetles; sap
