= List of wheat diseases =

This article is a list of diseases of wheat (Triticum spp.) grouped by causative agent.

== Bacterial diseases ==
Bacterial diseases
| Bacterial leaf blight | Pseudomonas syringae ssp. syringae |
| Bacterial mosaic | Clavibacter michiganensis subsp. tessellarius |
| Bacterial sheath rot | Pseudomonas fuscovaginae |
| Basal glume rot | Pseudomonas syringae pv. atrofaciens |
| Black chaff = bacterial leaf streak | Xanthomonas translucens pv. translucens |
| Pink seed | Erwinia rhapontici |
| Spike blight = gummosis | Rathayibacter tritici; Clavibacter tritici; Corynebacterium michiganense pv. tritici; Cl. iranicus |

== Fungal diseases ==
Fungal diseases
| Alternaria leaf blight | Alternaria triticina |
| Anthracnose | Glomerella graminicola (anamorph Colletotrichum graminicola) |
| Ascochyta leaf spot | Ascochyta tritici |
| Aureobasidium decay | Microdochium bolleyi; Aureobasidium bolleyi |
| Black head molds = sooty molds | Alternaria spp.; Cladosporium spp.; Epicoccum spp.; Sporobolomyces spp.; Stemphylium spp.; and other genera |
| Black point = kernel smudge | associated with fungal infection, primarily: Alternaria spp.; Cochliobolus sativus; Cladosporium spp. |
| Cephalosporium stripe | Hymenula cerealis; Cephalosporium gramineum |
| Common bunt = stinking smut | Tilletia tritici; Tilletia caries; Tilletia laevis; Tilletia foetida |
| Common root rot | Cochliobolus sativus [teleomorph]; Bipolaris sorokiniana [anamorph]; syn. Helminthosporium sativum |
| Cottony snow mold | Coprinus psychromorbidus |
| crown rot of wheatCrown rot = foot rot, seedling blight, dryland root rot | Fusarium spp.; Fusarium pseudograminearum; Gibberella zeae; Fusarium graminearum Group II [anamorph]; Gibberella avenacea; Fusarium avenaceum [anamorph]; Fusarium culmorum |
| Dilophospora leaf spot = twist | Dilophospora alopecuri |
| Downy mildew = crazy top | Sclerophthora macrospora |
| Dwarf bunt | Tilletia controversa |
| Ergot | Claviceps purpurea; Sphacelia segetum [anamorph] |
| Eyespot = foot rot, strawbreaker | Tapesia yallundae; Ramulispora herpotrichoides [anamorph]; Pseudocercosporella herpotrichoides W-pathotype; Tapesia acuformis; Ramulispora acuformis [anamorph]; Pseudocercosporella herpotrichoides var. acuformis R-pathoytpe |
| False eyespot | Gibellina cerealis |
| Flag smut | Urocystis agropyri |
| Foot rot = dryland foot rot | Fusarium spp. |
| Halo spot | Pseudoseptoria donacis; Selenophoma donacis |
| Karnal bunt = partial bunt | Tilletia indica; syn. Neovossia indica |
| Leaf rust = brown rust | Puccinia triticina; syn. Puccinia recondita f.sp. tritici; Puccinia tritici-duri |
| Leptosphaeria leaf spot | Phaeosphaeria herpotrichoides; Leptosphaeria herpotrichoides; Stagonospora sp. [anamorph] |
| Loose smut | Ustilago tritici; Ustilago segetum var. tritici; Ustilago segetum var. nuda; Ustilago segetum var. avenae |
| Microscopica leaf spot | Phaeosphaeria microscopica; syn. Leptosphaeria microscopica |
| Phoma spot | Phoma spp.; Phoma glomerata; Phoma sorghina; Phoma insidiosa |
| Pink snow mold = Fusarium patch | Microdochium nivale; Fusarium nivale; Monographella nivalis [teleomorph] |
| Platyspora leaf spot | Clathrospora pentamera; Platyspora pentamera |
| Powdery mildew | Blumeria graminis |
| Pythium root rot | Pythium aphanidermatum; Pythium arrhenomanes; Pythium graminicola; Pythium myriotylum; Pythium volutum |
| Rhizoctonia root rot | Rhizoctonia solani; Thanatephorus cucumeris [teleomorph] |
| Ring spot = Wirrega blotch | Pyrenophora seminiperda; Drechslera campanulata; Drechslera wirreganensis |
| Scab = head blight = Fusarium head blight (FHB) | Fusarium spp.; Gibberella zeae; Fusarium graminearum Group II [anamorph]; Gibberella avenacea; Fusarium avenaceum [anamorph]; Fusarium culmorum; Microdochium nivale; Fusarium nivale; Monographella nivalis [teleomorph] |
| Sclerotinia snow mold = snow scald | Myriosclerotinia borealis; Sclerotinia borealis |
| Sclerotium wilt (see Southern blight) | Sclerotium rolfsii; Athelia rolfsii [teleomorph] |
| Septoria blotch | Septoria tritici; Mycosphaerella graminicola [teleomorph] |
| Sharp eyespot | Rhizoctonia cerealis; Ceratobasidium cereale [teleomorph] |
| Snow rot | Pythium spp.; Pythium aristosporum; Pythium iwayamae; Pythium okanoganense |
| Southern blight = Sclerotium base rot | Sclerotium rolfsii; Athelia rolfsii [teleomorph] |
| Speckled snow mold = gray snow mold or Typhula blight | Typhula idahoensis; Typhula incarnata; Typhula ishikariensis; Typhula ishikariensis var. canadensis |
| Spot blotch | Cochliobolus sativus [teleomorph]; Bipolaris sorokiniana [anamorph]; Helminthosporium sativum |
| Stagonospora blotch | Phaeosphaeria avenaria f.sp. triticae; Stagonospora avenae f.sp. triticae [anamorph]; Septoria avenae f.sp. triticea; Phaeosphaeria nodorum; Stagonospora nodorum [anamorph]; Septoria nodorum |
| Stem rust = black rust | Puccinia graminis; Puccinia graminis f.sp. tritici (Ug99) |
| Storage molds | Aspergillus spp.; Penicillium spp.; and others |
| Stripe rust = yellow rust | Puccinia striiformis; Uredo glumarum [anamorph] |
| Take-all | Gaeumannomyces graminis var. tritici; Gaeumannomyces graminis var. avenae |
| Tan spot = yellow leaf spot, red smudge | Pyrenophora tritici-repentis; Drechslera tritici-repentis [anamorph] |
| Tar spot | Phyllachora graminis; Linochora graminis [anamorph] |
| Wheat Blast | Magnaporthe grisea |
| Zoosporic root rot | Lagena radicicola; Ligniera pilorum; Olpidium brassicae; Rhizophydium graminis |

== Viral diseases ==
Viral diseases
| African cereal streak | see Maize streak |
| Agropyron mosaic | genus Rymovirus, Agropyron mosaic virus (AgMV) |
| Australian wheat striate mosaic | see Chloris striate mosaic |
| Barley stripe mosaic | genus Hordeivirus, Barley stripe mosaic virus (BSMV) |
| Barley yellow dwarf | genus Luteovirus, Barley yellow dwarf virus (BYDV) |
| Barley yellow streak mosaic | Barley yellow streak mosaic virus |
| Barley yellow striate mosaic | genus Cytorhabdovirus, Barley yellow striate mosaic virus (BYSMV) |
| Barley yellow stripe | see Barley stripe mosaic |
| Brome mosaic | genus Bromovirus, Brome mosaic virus (BMV) |
| Cereal northern mosaic | genus Cytorhabdovirus, Cereal northern mosaic virus (NCMV) |
| Cereal tillering | Cereal tillering virus |
| Chloris striate mosaic | genus Monogeminivirus, Chloris striate mosaic virus (CSMV) |
| Cocksfoot mottle | genus Sobemovirus, Cocksfoot mottle virus (CoMV) |
| Eastern wheat striate | Eastern wheat striate virus |
| Enanismo | Probable virus or phytoplasma |
| High plains disease | Probable virus. Vectored by wheat curl mite, Aceria tosichella |
| Maize streak | genus Monogeminivirus, Maize streak virus (MSV) |
| Northern cereal mosaic | genus Cytorhabdovirus, Cereal northern mosaic virus (NCMV) |
| Oat sterile dwarf | genus Fijivirus, Oat sterile dwarf virus (OSDV) |
| Rice black-streaked dwarf | genus Fijivirus, Rice black-streaked dwarf virus (RBSDV) |
| Rice hoja blanca | genus Tenuivirus, Rice hoja blanca virus (RHBV) |
| Russian winter wheat mosaic | genus Cytorhabdovirus, Russian winter wheat mosaic virus (WWRMV) |
| Seedborne wheat yellows | Seedborne wheat yellows viroid |
| Tobacco mosaic | genus Tobamovirus, Tobacco mosaic virus (TMV) |
| Wheat American striate mosaic | genus Nucleorhabdovirus, Wheat American striate mosaic virus (WASMV) |
| Wheat chlorotic streak = Wheat chlorotic streak mosaic | see Barley yellow striate mosaic |
| Wheat dwarf | genus Monogeminivirus, Wheat dwarf virus (WDV) |
| Wheat European striate mosaic | genus Tenuivirus, Wheat European striate mosaic virus (EWSMV) |
genus Emaravirus, Wheat mosaic virus (WMoV)
| Wheat rosette stunt | see Cereal northern mosaic |
| Wheat soilborne mosaic | genus Furovirus, Wheat soil-borne mosaic virus (SBWMV) |
| Wheat soilborne yellow mosaic | Wheat soil-borne yellow mosaic virus |
| Wheat spindle streak mosaic | a strain of Wheat yellow mosaic virus |
| Wheat spot mosaic | Probable virus or phytoplasma |
| Wheat streak mosaic | genus Tritimovirus, Wheat streak mosaic virus (WSMV) |
| Wheat striate mosaic | see Wheat American striate mosaic |
| Wheat yellow leaf | genus Closterovirus, Wheat yellow leaf virus (WYLV) |
| Wheat yellow mosaic | Wheat yellow mosaic virus = Wheat spindle streak mosaic virus |

== Phytoplasmal diseases ==
Phytoplasmal diseases
| Aster yellows | Aster yellows phytoplasma |

== Nematodes, parasitic ==
Nematodes, parasitic
| Cereal cyst nematode | Heterodera avenae |
| Grass cyst nematode | Punctodera punctata |
| Root gall nematode | Subanguina spp. |
| Root-knot nematode | Meloidogyne spp.: Meloidogyne naasi; Meloidogyne chitwoodi |
| Seed gall = ear-cockle nematode = wheat gall nematode | Anguina tritici |
