= List of barley diseases =

This article is a list of diseases of barley (Hordeum vulgare).

== Bacterial and fungal diseases ==
Bacterial Diseases
Black chaff and bacterial streak	Xanthomonas translucens pv. translucens
Bacterial kernel blight	Pseudomonas syringae pv. syringae
Bacterial leaf blight	Pseudomonas syringae pv. syringae
Bacterial stripe	Pseudomonas syringae pv. striafaciens
Basal glume rot	Pseudomonas syringae pv. atrofaciens
Bacterial blight	Xanthomonas campestris pv. translucens

Fungal diseases
Anthracnose	Colletotrichum cereale Manns
Barley stripe	Pyrenophora graminea = Drechslera graminea
Cephalosporium stripe	Hymenula cerealis = Cephalosporium gramineum
Common root rot, crown rot and seedling blight	Cochliobolus sativus = Bipolaris sorokiniana Fusarium culmorum Fusarium graminearum Gibberella zeae [teleomorph]
Downy mildew	Sclerophthora rayssiae
Dwarf bunt	Tilletia controversa
Ergot	Claviceps purpurea Sphacelia segetum [anamorph]
Eyespot	Pseudocercosoporella herpotrichoides Tapesia yallundae [teleomorph]
Halo spot	Pseudoseptoria donacis = Selenophoma donacis
Kernel blight = black point	Alternaria spp. Arthrinium arundinis Apiospora montagnei [teleomorph] Cochliobolus sativus Fusarium spp.
Ascochyta leaf spot	Ascochyta hordei Ascochyta graminea Ascochyta sorghi Ascochyta tritici
Net blotch	Drechslera teres Pyrenophora teres [teleomorph]
Net blotch (spot form)	Drechslera teres f. maculata
Powdery mildew	Blumeria hordei
Pythium root rot	Pythium spp. Pythium arrhenomanes Pythium graminicola Pythium tardicrescens
Rhizoctonia root rot	Rhizoctonia solani Thanatephorus cucumeris [teleomorph]
Rusts
Crown rust	Puccinia coronata var. hordei
Leaf rust	Puccinia hordei
Stem rust	Puccinia graminis f.sp. secalis Puccinia graminis f.sp. tritici
Stripe rust = yellow rust	Puccinia striiformis f. sp. hordei
...
Scab = head blight	Fusarium spp. Fusarium graminearum
Scald	Rhynchosporium secalis
Septoria speckled leaf blotch	Septoria passerinii Stagonospora avenae f.sp. triticae
Sharp eyespot	Rhizoctonia cerealis Ceratobasidium cereale [teleomorph]
Smuts
Covered smut	Ustilago hordei
False loose smut	Ustilago nigra = Ustilago avenae
Loose smut	Ustilago nuda = Ustilago tritici
Snow molds
Gray snow mold = Typhula blight	Typhula incarnata Typhula ishikariensis
Pink snow mold = Fusarium patch	Microdochium nivale = Fusarium nivale Monographella nivalis [teleomorph]
Speckled snow mold	Typhula idahoensis
...
Snow rot	Pythium iwayamae Pythium okanoganense Pythium paddicum
Snow scald = Sclerotinia snow mold	Myriosclerotinia borealis = Sclerotinia borealis
Southern blight	Sclerotium rolfsii Athelia rolfsii [teleomorph]
Spot blotch	Cochliobolus sativus Drechslera teres [anamorph]
Stagonospora blotch	Stagonospora avenae f.sp. triticae Phaeosphaeria avenaria f.sp. triticae [teleomorph] Stagonospora nodorum = Septoria nodorum Phaeosphaeria nodorum [teleomorph]
Take-all	Gaeumannomyces graminis var tritici
Tan spot	Pyrenophora tritici-repentis = Pyrenophora trichostoma Drechslera tritici-repentis [anamorph] = Helminthosporium tritici-repentis
Verticillium wilt	Verticillium dahliae
Wirrega blotch	Drechslera wirreganensis

== Nematodes, parasitic ==
Nematodes, parasitic
Cereal cyst nematode	Heterodera avenae Heterodera filipjevi Heterodera latipons
Cereal root knot nematode	Meloidogyne spp. Meloidogyne naasi Meloidogyne artiellia Meloidogyne chitwoodi
Root gall nematode	Subanguina radicicola
Root lesion nematode	Pratylenchus spp.
Stunt nematode	Merlinius brevidens Tylenchorhynchus dubius Tylenchorhynchus maximus

== Virus, viroid and virus-like diseases ==
Virus, viroid and virus-like diseases
African cereal streak	African cereal streak virus
Barley mild mosaic	genus Bymovirus, Barley mild mosaic bymovirus (BaMMV)
Barley mosaic	Barley mosaic virus
Barley stripe mosaic	genus Hordeivirus, Barley stripe mosaic virus (BSMV)
Barley yellow dwarf	genus Luteovirus, Barley yellow dwarf virus (BYDV)
Barley yellow streak mosaic	Barley yellow streak mosaic virus
Barley yellow stripe	virus-like agent
Brome mosaic	genus Bromovirus, Brome mosaic virus (BMV)
Cereal northern mosaic = barley yellow striate mosaic	genus Cytorhabdovirus, Northern cereal mosaic virus (NCMV)
Cereal tillering	genus Reovirus, Cereal tillering disease virus (CTDV)
Chloris striate mosaic	genus Monogeminivirus, Chloris striate mosaic virus (CSMV)
Eastern wheat striate	Eastern wheat striate virus
Enanismo	virus like agent
Hordeum mosaic	genus Rymovirus, Hordeum mosaic virus (HoMV)
Oat blue dwarf	genus Marafivirus, Oat blue dwarf virus(OBDV)
Oat pseudorosette	genus Tenuivirus, Oat pseudorosette virus
Oat sterile dwarf	genus Fijivirus, Oat sterile dwarf virus (OSDV)
Rice black-streaked dwarf	genus Fijivirus, Rice black-streaked dwarf virus (RBSDV)
Rice stripe	genus Tenuivirus, Rice stripe virus (RSV)
Russian winter wheat mosaic	Winter wheat Russian mosaic virus (WWRMV)
Wheat dwarf	genus Monogeminivirus, Wheat dwarf virus (WDV)
Wheat soil-borne mosaic	genus Furovirus, Wheat soil-borne mosaic virus (SBWMV)
Wheat streak mosaic	genus Ryemovirus, Wheat streak mosaic virus (WSMV)
Wheat yellow leaf	genus Closterovirus, Wheat yellow leaf virus (WYLV)

== Phytoplasma diseases ==
Mycoplasmal diseases
Aster yellows	Aster yellows phytoplasma

== Miscellaneous diseases and disorders ==
Miscellaneous diseases and disorders
Physiological leaf spot	Unknown

== Sources ==
- Barley Diseases, Queensland Government, Australia
- EPPO Standards, Guidelines on good plant protection - Barley, Europe
- Barley Disease Handbook, NDSU, US
- Barley Disease Index, TAMU, US
- Common Names of Diseases, The American Phytopathological Society, US
- USDA ARS Fungal Database
