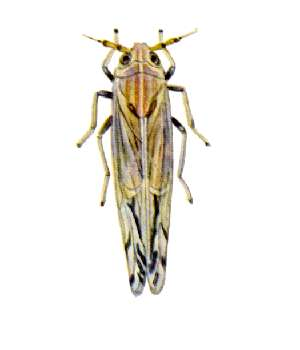

Scientific classification
- Kingdom: Animalia
- Phylum: Arthropoda
- Class: Insecta
- Order: Hemiptera
- Suborder: Auchenorrhyncha
- Infraorder: Fulgoromorpha
- Family: Delphacidae
- Genus: Peregrinus
- Species: P. maidis

Binomial name
- Peregrinus maidis (Ashmead, 1890)

Synonyms
- Delphax maidis Ashmead, 1890; Delphax psylloides Lethierryi, 1894; Pundaluoya simplicia Distant, 1906

= Peregrinus maidis =

Species of true bug

Peregrinus maidis, commonly known as the corn planthopper or shoot bug, is a species of insect in the order Hemiptera and the family Delphacidae. It is widespread throughout most tropical and subtropical regions on earth, including southern North America, South America, Africa, Australia, Southeast Asia and China. P. maidis are a commercially important pest of maize and its relatives. In addition to physical plant damage, P. maidis is the vector for several species-specific maize viruses, including maize stripe virus, maize mosaic virus and the non-pathogenic Peregrinus maidis reovirus.

== Description ==
Peregrinus maidis demonstrate sexual dimorphism in body size between males and females. Males have a body length of 2mm with a 6mm wingspan, whereas females are slightly larger at 3mm long and 7mm wingspan. The species is mainly yellow with dark brown to black markings, but colouration ranges from greenish-yellow to brownish-yellow. The forewings are longer than the body. The hind tibiae possess multiple spines and a large movable spur.

== Distribution and habitat ==
Peregrinus maidis are found in most tropical and subtropical regions throughout the world including the southeast United States, Hawaii, Central and South America, Africa, Australia, Southeast Asia and southern China. The species thrives in low elevation, high humidity locations and populations will decrease at altitudes above 800m. It is suspected that P. maidis cannot move into higher latitudes due to an inability to overwinter.

Peregrinus maidis are thought to have originated in Australia as a pest of sorghum but quickly spread with the widespread cultivation of the closely related sugarcane and maize plants. This specificity to feed on a single tribe of plants results in P. maidis being classified as an oligophagous herbivore. Attempts to rear the species on other host plants has resulted in decreased fecundity, body size, life span, and slower nymph development.

== Life cycle ==
Females lay 20-30 eggs within the midribs of their host-plant's leaves. Under normal conditions, development from hatchling to adult takes approximately 20 days. However, development of P. maidis nymphs is highly temperature dependent. Normal development occurs between 20-27 °C and has five juvenile instar stages. Extreme temperatures (below 10 °C and above 30 °C) result in a loss of the fifth instar and a direct molt from fourth instar to adult, but full development is extended dramatically to 74 days. Rearing at a temperature of 15 °C results in an extra, sixth, instar and a 65-day development time. P. maidis occupies warm climates and is able to reproduce year round, but development is affected by temperature changes. Another factor that affects development is nutrient availability. Increased levels of nitrogen fertilizers in plant tissues result in shorter development times, more eggs produced, and increases in juvenile survival rates and adult body size.

Similar to other planthoppers, two different types (morphs) of adult P. maidis can develop depending on environmental conditions. The first, brachypterous, have short, underdeveloped wings and most often develop as a response to high quality host plants, low conspecific density, and no need for dispersal. The second, macropterous, have fully developed wings and emerge when dispersal is required due to high population density or low quality host plants. The purpose of the macropters is to disperse and lay eggs on corn seedlings, whereas the brachypters are to simply feed on the growing plant and reproduce. Once the plant starts to age, more macropters are produced and the cycle continues.

== Interactions with humans ==
=== Role as a pest ===
Peregrinus maidis are an economically important pest of maize. Infestations will physically damage the host plant because the insect breaks through the vascular tissue with its tibia spur and feeds on the sap exuded. The physical results on the plant includes wilting, yellowing of the leaves, stem weakness, and even death. Damage is more severe in young or drought-stressed plants. In addition to physical damage, P. maidis can also introduce mold and infection to the plant while piercing the tissues. P. maidis feeding behaviour alone can result in a 10-15% crop loss.

=== Role as a disease vector ===
Peregrinus maidis is a vector for several species-specific maize viruses. Peregrinus maidis reovirus (PgMV) from the family Reoviridae, is a non-pathogenic virus transmitted by the insect. Maize mosaic rhabdovirus (MMV) (family: Rhabdoviridae) and maize tenuivirus (MStV) (genus: Tenuivirus) are important viruses that are pathogenic and can reduce crop yield by 9-90%. It has been suggested that the spread of P. maidis and these two viruses to the New World contributed to the collapse of the Mayan civilization.

MMV is not transmitted from parent to offspring; instead, individuals become infected with the virus when they feed on an infected plant. Any juvenile instar stage can become infected, but the virus has a 3-week latency period before it can be transmitted to another plant. Therefore, usually only adults are able to pass the infection onto a healthy plant. Macropterous adults dispersing to a new plant actively avoid plants that are showing symptoms of MMV infection. These adults demonstrate a preference for asymptomatic plants. They are most likely responding to a cue about the quality of the host plant.

=== Resistance to pest ===
Research is exploring how to reduce crop loss by P. maidis and the diseases they carry. Farmers should avoid using nitrogen fertilizers which have been shown to directly increase the success of P. maidis. Unfortunately, no natural plant resistance exists so entomologists are searching for a synthetic alternative. Recently, scientists have introduced corn that possess a modified resistance gene that has demonstrated some success. The genetically modified corn had decreased infection and transmission of MMV, but did not affect the fitness of P. maidis or the ability for the insect to be infected by MMV. Instead, the gene increased the plant’s resistance to the virus, which decreased the disease transmission rate.

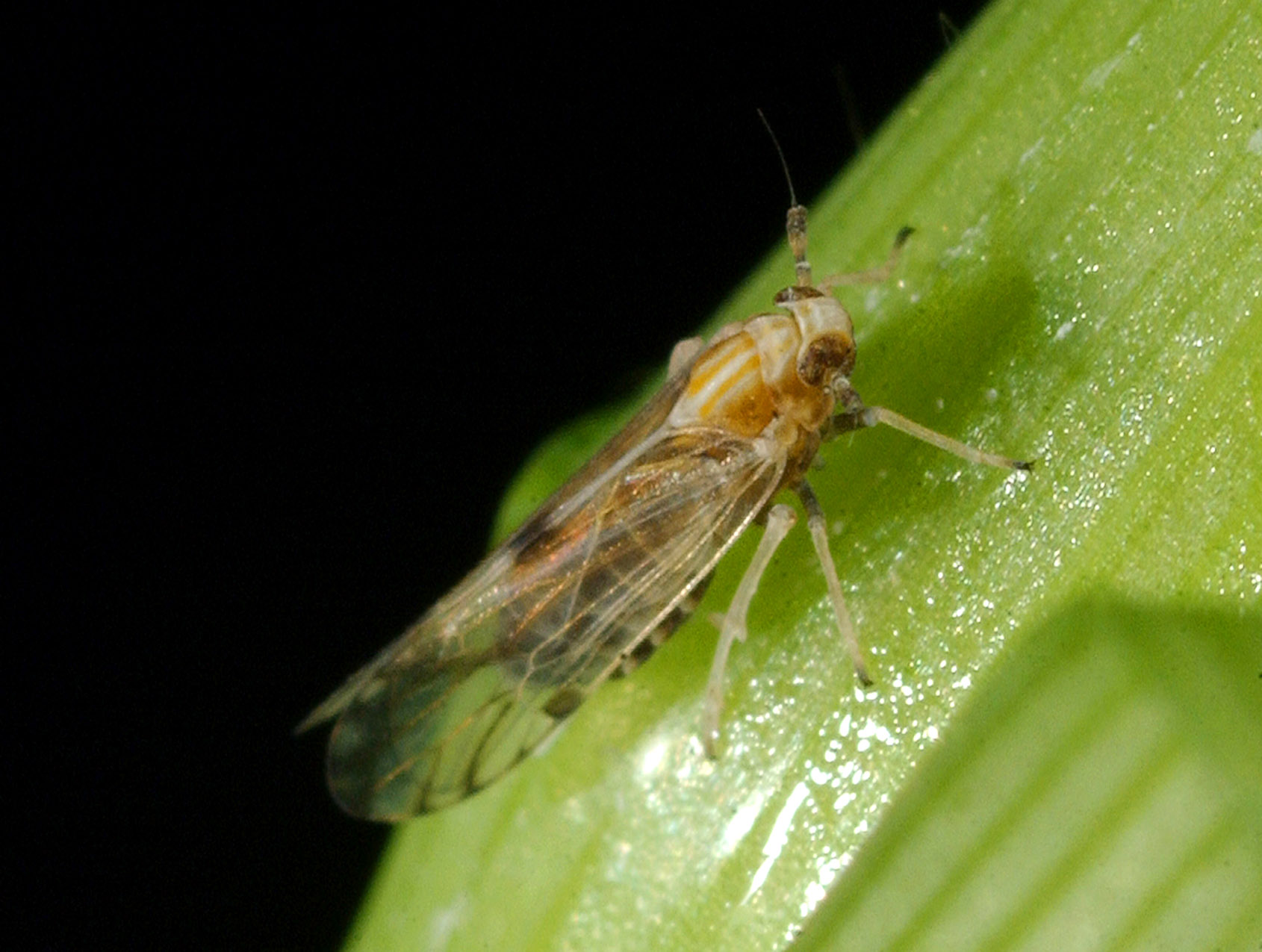
