= High plains disease =

Viral plant disease

High plains disease is a viral disease afflicting wheat and maize. It is caused by the negative-sense ssRNA virus High Plains wheat mosaic emaravirus. Symptoms are similar to Wheat streak mosaic virus, with leaf veins showing yellow flecks and streaks, followed by leaf margin purpling in maize. Depending on the timing of infection, stunting and death occur. Plants can be doubly infected with high plains virus and wheat streak mosaic virus.

== Vector and hosts ==
High plains virus is spread by wheat curl mites, Aceria tosichella, which are small enough to be carried on air currents. Sandbur grass species are a known host for the wheat curl mite. High plains disease also may occur on barley, oats and rye, and on drooping brome Bromus tectorum and yellow foxtail Setaria pumila grasses.

== Management ==
An ELISA test is available to detect high plains disease. Infection can be avoided by elimination of volunteer crop and wild host plants prior to planting. Resistant varieties of maize exist.
