= Rice hoja blanca virus =

Pathogenic virus

Rice hoja blanca virus (RHBV), Spanish for "white leaf rice virus", is a plant virus in the family Phenuiviridae. RHBV causes Hoja blanca disease (HBD), which affects the leaves of the rice plant Oryza sativa, stunting the growth of the plant or killing it altogether. RHBV is carried by an insect vector, Tagosodes orizicolus, a type of planthopper. The virus is found in South America, Mexico, throughout Central America, the Caribbean region, and the southern United States. In South America, the disease is endemic to Colombia, Venezuela, Ecuador, Peru, Suriname, French Guiana and Guyana.

== Virology ==
Rice hoja blanca virus

Virus classification
- (unranked): Virus
- Realm: Riboviria
- Kingdom: Orthornavirae
- Phylum: Negarnaviricota
- Class: Bunyaviricetes
- Order: Hareavirales
- Family: Phenuiviridae
- Genus: Tenuivirus
- Species: Tenuivirus oryzalbae

Synonyms
- Rice hoja blanca tenuivirus

=== Viral classification ===
RHBV is a single stranded, negative-sense RNA virus of the genus Tenuivirus, derived from the Latin "tenui", meaning thin or weak. This comes from the nature of Tenuiviruses to form thin, filamentous viral particles. Other viruses in the genus Tenuivirus include maize stripe virus (MSV), rice stripe virus (RSV), and rice grassy stunt virus (RGSV). While RHBV and other tenuiviruses have single stranded RNA genomes, it is interesting to note that examination of non-denaturing gel electrophoresis performed with tenuiviruses has yielded both single stranded and double stranded RNA. Because it is unlikely that both single stranded and double stranded RNA's are encapsidated within the viral ribonucleoprotein, it is theorized that the double stranded RNA sometimes present in gel electrophoresis results comes from the annealing in vitro of single stranded RNA's that possess opposite polarities.

=== Viral structure ===
Previous to 1982, RHBV was theorized to be a part of the Closterovirus group, due to the presence of 8-10 nanometer particles observed in the cells of plants affected by HBV. Such particles are often found in cells affected by closteroviruses. However, further research into the subject yielded results indicating that RHBV was more similar to viruses in the newly formed Tenuivirus group. The particle morphology of tenuiviruses is largely consistent across the genus, and RHBV is no exception. RHBV forms fine, thin, filamentous non-enveloped nucleocapsid particles that vary in length and range from 3 nanometers to 8 nanometers in width. Examination of viral particles from infected plant cells indicates that they are sometimes configured in tight, heliocentric spiral formations. However, RHBV ribonucleoproteins tend to be mostly circular in formation, as are many other members of the genus Tenuivirus.

== Genome ==
RHBV possesses a tetrapartite genomic structure, meaning that the RHBV genome is composed of four separate RNA components, named RNA1-RNA4, and are ordered in decreasing base pair size. These components encode for the enzyme and various proteins that make up the virion. RNA1 is 8,999 base pairs long and is the first and largest segment of the genome, encoding for the viral RNA-dependent RNA polymerase, which is used by the virus to help synthesize a complementary RNA strand. RNA2 (3,620 base pairs) encodes for the first nonstructural protein (NS2) and a membrane glycoprotein. RNA3 (2,299 base pairs) encodes for another nonstructural protein (NS3) and the nucleocapsid protein. RNA4 (1,998 base pairs) encodes for the major nonstructural protein and another minor nonstructural protein, NS4. RNA2-RNA4 use an ambisense coding strategy, meaning those RNA segments contain both negative sense and positive sense sections, in order to code for two proteins.

== Replication cycle ==
=== In insects ===
RHBV is propagative, meaning it infects both host plants and its insect vector. Tagosodes orizicolus (changed from Sogatodes orizycola in 1993), is a species of planthopper, and the known common vector of RHBV. It belongs to the family Delphacidae, as do the planthopper vectors of other tenuiviruses. T. orizicolus feed in the phloem of target plants, giving them the unique ability to infect plants without outright destroying plant tissue, which in turn promotes successful infection by RHBV. However, plants can be susceptible to "hopper burn", where excessive feeding cause an affected plant to dry up. Infection in T. orizicolus begins when a planthopper feeds on an infected plant. After the virus is acquired by the host, it will incubate for a period ranging for 4–31 days. The infected planthopper can then transmit the virus to new plants it feeds on. Vertical transmission is possible transovarially from infected females to their offspring and from males to their progeny, although RHBV is the only tenuivirus known to be paternally transmitted. Transmission efficiency is variable between different populations of T. orizicolus, and can be selectively bred to 100% efficiency over controlled generations.

=== In plants ===
Plant infection for RHBV is relatively standard for negative-sense single stranded RNA plant viruses, consisting of entering the cell, using an RNA-dependent RNA polymerase to convert to positive-sense RNA, and using the host's cellular machinery to produce viral proteins and genomes. Research shows that RHBV likely uses "cap-snatching", a technique where the virus cleaves and uses the 5' cap of the mRNA of the host cell, in order to begin synthesis of viral mRNA. However, there are some unique qualities possessed by RHBV. The NS3 protein encoded by RNA3 has been shown to suppress RNA silencing in both rice and insect vectors, contributing to the successful propagation of the virus. Research shows that RNA3 interferes with the cell's siRNA's by binding to them, which in turn suppresses their ability to assist in RNA silencing. Also interesting to note is that NS4 is synthesized in large amounts in RHBV infected plant cells. In the rice stripe virus genome, research shows that it is likely that RSV NS4 is a movement protein that accumulates adjacent to and inside of cell walls and helps move viruses or infectious material between plant cells. Due to similar accumulation of NS4 in RHBV infected cells, it is possible that RHBV NS4 serves a similar purpose, although this has not yet been explicitly confirmed by experimentation.

The RHBV NS3 protein is a suppressor of RNA silencing used by hosts for host defense. Analogs exist in other tenuiviruses.

== RHBV symptoms ==
The symptoms caused by RHBV are seen across the whole spectrum of the infected plant, and can be different depending on the specific rice strain and the age of the plant upon infection. Plant tissues that are already mature upon infection remain symptomless, while immature tissues display a variety of symptoms. Approximately 4 days after infection, cream-colored spots ranging in size from 2–5 millimetres (0.079–0.197 in) begin to appear on immature leaves. Eventually, infected leaves suffer chlorosis and the spots turn white as the leaves mature, giving the virus its namesake. As time goes on, chlorotic spots increase and form stripes, with entire leaves eventually succumbing to infection and becoming completely chlorotic. RHBV infection is systemic to the plant, and subsequent leaves will emerge displaying either heavy stripes or complete chlorosis. Tillers infected by RHBV will be stunted compared to normal, non-infected tillers. The panicles of infected tillers may be sterile, and often have malformed or discolored grains. Root size and number will reduce, with the roots eventually turning brown and dying completely.

RHBV can also cause symptoms in its insect vector, infecting various organs and glands in the planthopper. These infections can have mild to severe results on the host, leading to organ failure, respiratory and digestive track failure, and muscle atrophy Such infections can possibly reduce the fertility or longevity of an infected female.

== History and impact ==
RHBV was first described biologically in the 1980s, although it had been destroying rice crops in the Americas for almost half a century before scientists were able to understand it and identify it as a viral agent. The first hint that HBD was caused by a virus came from the cyclical nature of its epidemics and their association with the planthopper T. orizicolis. Agricultural records indicate that the disease was first observed in the Cauca Valley area of Colombia in 1935. Within approximately 3 decades, RHBV and the associated HBD were present in various South American countries and had crossed the Caribbean sea to Cuba and the southern Florida peninsula. It has since been affecting rice crops in many countries located throughout both tropical and subtropical America, generating moderate to severe yield losses. In 1965, yield losses in Cuba and Venezuela ranged between 25 and 50%. In 1981, serious epidemics in the countries of Colombia, Ecuador, and Venezuela occurred, causing yield losses of up to 100% in the worse cases.

== Similarities to other viruses ==
RHBV is most closely related to Echinocloa hoja blanca virus (EHBV), another member of the Tenuivirus genus. Proteins in both the RHBV genome and the EHBV genome have been shown to be antigenically related and to possess a high degree of similarity. However, the two viruses have separate insect vectors, with EHBV infecting Tagosodes cubanus and RHBV infecting T. orizicolis. Nucleotide sequence similarity is around 80-85% in coding regions, and only 46-53% in non-coding regions.
