= Drechslera gigantea =

Scientific classification
- Kingdom: Fungi
- Division: Ascomycota
- Class: Dothideomycetes
- Order: Pleosporales
- Family: Pleosporaceae
- Genus: Drechslera
- Species: D. gigantea

Binomial name
- Drechslera gigantea (Heald & F.A. Wolf) S. Ito, (1930)
- Helminthosporium giganteum Heald & F.A.Wolf, (1898)

Species of fungus

Drechslera gigantea is a plant pathogen that causes eyespot disease on many host plants. There are Poa pratensis turfgrass cultivars that are resistant to D. gigantea, although that resistance is not as effective when stressed. In 2020, multilocus sequencing identified this pathogen as a member of the genus Bipolaris and proposed D. gigantea be transferred to Bipolaris gigantea.
