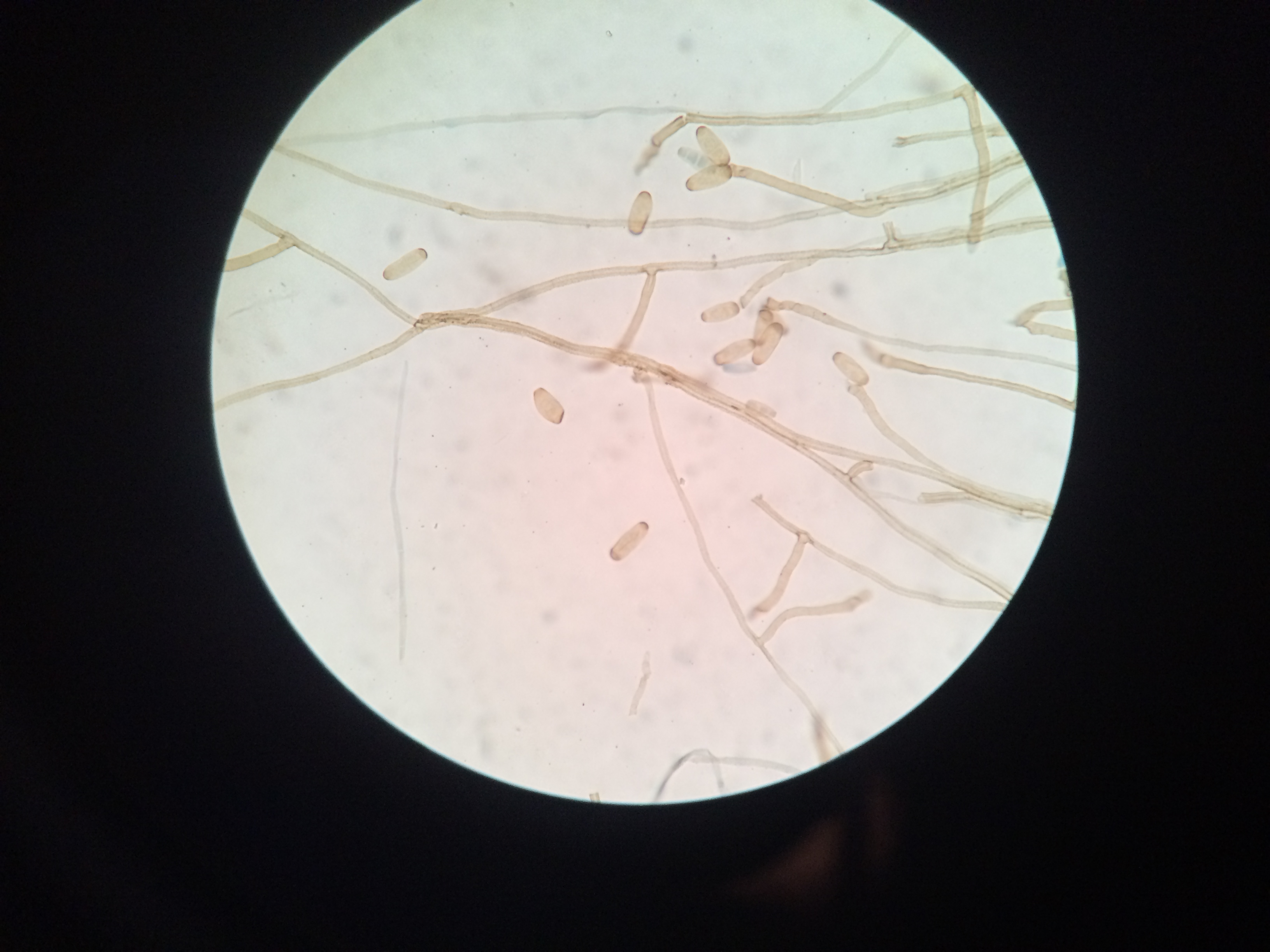
- Drechslera under a microscope

Scientific classification
- Kingdom: Fungi
- Division: Ascomycota
- Class: Dothideomycetes
- Order: Pleosporales
- Family: Pleosporaceae
- Genus: Drechslera; S.Ito 1930

Species
- See text

= Drechslera =

Genus of fungi

Drechslera is a genus of fungi. Many of the species in this genus are plant pathogens. Several species of Drechslera are known to cause a fungal disease of turfgrass known as Drechslera leaf spot.

== Species ==
The following species are accepted within Drechslera:

- Drechslera andersenii A.Lam
- Drechslera apii (Göbelez) M.J.Richardson & E.M.Fraser
- Drechslera arizonica (R.Sprague) Subram. & B.L.Jain
- Drechslera avenacea (M.A.Curtis ex Cooke) Shoemaker
- Drechslera avenicola B.D.Sun & T.Y.Zhang
- Drechslera boeremae A.S.Patil & V.G.Rao
- Drechslera campanulata (Lév.) B.Sutton
- Drechslera chattopadhyayi N.C.Mandal & M.K.Dasgupta
- Drechslera cymmartinii A.P.Misra & R.A.Singh
- Drechslera dematioidea
- Drechslera elliptica H.F.Wang & T.Y.Zhang, 2017
- Drechslera ellisii Danquah
- Drechslera eragrostidis (Henn.) Subram. & B.L.Jain
- Drechslera euphorbiae (Hansf.) M.B.Ellis
- Drechslera festucae Scharif
- Drechslera fici T.P.Mall & Aj.Kumar, 2013
- Drechslera flavispora Ondřej
- Drechslera frauensteinii M.Sass
- Drechslera gigantea (Heald & F.A.Wolf) S.Ito
- Drechslera graminea (Schltdl. ex Rabenh.) Shoemaker, 1962
- Drechslera helianthi Hulea
- Drechslera holci Ondřej
- Drechslera hongkongensis J.M.Yen
- Drechslera linicola (Kletsh.) Ondřej
- Drechslera litseae Gadp., C.D.Sharma, Firdousi, A.N.Rai & K.M.Vyas
- Drechslera mediocris (V.A.Putterill) Subram. & B.L.Jain
- Drechslera musae-sapientium (Hansf.) M.B.Ellis
- Drechslera ocella (Faris) Subram. & B.L.Jain
- Drechslera pallida Porta-Puglia & Del Serrone
- Drechslera patereae M.R.Carranza
- Drechslera poae (Baudy) Shoemaker
- Drechslera salviniae J.J.Muchovej
- Drechslera sesami (J.Miyake) M.J.Richardson & E.M.Fraser
- Drechslera siliculosa (P.Crouan & H.Crouan) Subram. & B.L.Jain
- Drechslera sivanesanii Manohar. & V.R.T.Reddy
- Drechslera triseti Ondřej
- Drechslera triticicola C.K.Pai, J.C.Zhang & X.T.Zhu
- Drechslera wirreganensis Wallwork, Lichon & Sivan.
- Drechslera yamadae (Y.Nisik.) Subram. & B.L.Jain
- Drechslera zizaniae (Y.Nisik.) Subram. & B.L.Jain
