= WSMV =

WSMV may refer to:

- WSMV-TV, a television station based in Nashville, Tennessee
- Wheat streak mosaic virus, a virus causing wheat streak mosaic
