= Drechslera dematioidea =

Scientific classification
- Domain: Eukaryota
- Kingdom: Fungi
- Division: Ascomycota
- Class: Dothideomycetes
- Order: Pleosporales
- Family: Pleosporaceae
- Genus: Drechslera
- Species: D. dematioidea

Binomial name
- Drechslera dematioidea (Bubák & Wróbl.) Subram. & B.L. Jain [as "dematioideum"], (1966)
- Drechslera dematioidea (Bubák & Wróbl.) Scharif, (1963); Helminthosporium dematioideum Bubák & Wróbl., (1916); Marielliottia dematioidea (Bubák & Wróbl.) Shoemaker, (1999)

Species of fungus

Drechslera dematioidea is a plant pathogen.
