= Oat pseudorosette virus =

Virus classification
- (unranked): Virus
- Realm: Riboviria
- Kingdom: Orthornavirae
- Phylum: Negarnaviricota
- Class: Bunyaviricetes
- Order: Hareavirales
- Family: Phenuiviridae
- Genus: Tenuivirus (?)
- Virus: Oat pseudorosette virus

Species of virus

Oat pseudorosette virus is a pathogenic plant virus, tentatively placed in Tenuivirus.
