= Meloidogyne artiellia =

Scientific classification
- Domain: Eukaryota
- Kingdom: Animalia
- Phylum: Nematoda
- Class: Secernentea
- Order: Tylenchida
- Family: Heteroderidae
- Genus: Meloidogyne
- Species: M. artiellia

Binomial name
- Meloidogyne artiellia Franklin, 1961

Species of roundworm

Meloidogyne artiellia, the British root-knot nematode, is a plant pathogenic nematode, infecting barley and chickpea. It is also an invasive species.

== See also ==
- List of barley diseases
- List of chickpea diseases
