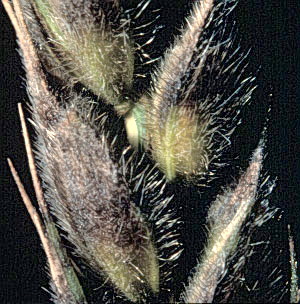
- Necrosis on wheat caused by Phaeosphaeria nodorum

Scientific classification
- Domain: Eukaryota
- Kingdom: Fungi
- Division: Ascomycota
- Class: Dothideomycetes
- Order: Pleosporales
- Family: Phaeosphaeriaceae
- Genus: Phaeosphaeria; I.Miyake (1909)

Type species
- Phaeosphaeria oryzae I.Miyake

Species
- See text

Synonyms
- Leptosphaerella Speg. (1909); Leptosphaerella (Sacc.) Hara (1913); Leptosphaerella Speg. (1912); Leptosphaeria sect. Leptosphaerella Sacc. (1883); Phaeoseptoria Speg. (1908); Phaeosphaeria subgen. Ovispora Leuchtm. (1987); Phaeosphaeria subgen. Phaeosphaeria I.Miyake (1909); Sulcispora Shoemaker & C.E.Babc. (1989); Trematosphaerella Kirschst. (1906)

= Phaeosphaeria =

Genus of fungi

Phaeosphaeria is a genus of fungi in the family Phaeosphaeriaceae. It has about 95 species. The genus was circumscribed by Japanese mycologist Ichiro Miyake in 1909, with Phaeosphaeria oryzae assigned as the type species.

== Species ==
As accepted by Species Fungorum;

- Phaeosphaeria acaciae Tennakoon, Phook. & K.D.Hyde (2017)
- Phaeosphaeria acori H.C.Greene (1949)
- Phaeosphaeria aeluropodis (Lobik) Tomilin (1985)
- Phaeosphaeria agminalis (Sacc. & Morthier) Tomilin (1985)
- Phaeosphaeria ampeli Tennakoon, C.H.Kuo & K.D.Hyde (2019)
- Phaeosphaeria anchiala Kohlm., Volkm.-Kohlm. & C.K.M.Tsui (2005)
- Phaeosphaeria annulata Shoemaker & C.E.Babc. (1989)
- Phaeosphaeria arenaria (A.L.Guyot) Shoemaker & C.E.Babc. (1989)
- Phaeosphaeria associata (Rehm) O.E.Erikss. (1967)
- Phaeosphaeria bambusae I.Miyake & Hara (1910)
- Phaeosphaeria barriae Fallah, J.L.Crane & Shearer (1998)
- Phaeosphaeria berlesei (M.J.Larsen & Munk) Hedjar. (1969)
- Phaeosphaeria borealis Shoemaker & C.E.Babc. (1989)
- Phaeosphaeria breonadiae Crous & Jol.Roux (2016)
- Phaeosphaeria brizae (Pass.) Shoemaker & C.E.Babc. (1989)
- Phaeosphaeria calamicola S.Konta & K.D.Hyde (2017)
- Phaeosphaeria calderi Shoemaker & C.E.Babc. (1989)
- Phaeosphaeria canadensis Shoemaker & C.E.Babc. (1989)
- Phaeosphaeria capensis Steinke & K.D.Hyde (1997)
- Phaeosphaeria caricicola (Fautrey) Leuchtm. (1984)
- Phaeosphaeria caricinella (P.Karst.) O.E.Erikss. (1967)
- Phaeosphaeria caricis (J.Schröt.) Leuchtm. (1984)
- Phaeosphaeria caricis-firmae (Petr.) Leuchtm. & Schmid-Heckel (1988)
- Phaeosphaeria caricis-vesicariae Tomilin (1993)
- Phaeosphaeria cassiicola (Ellis & Everh.) Huhndorf (1996)
- Phaeosphaeria cattanei (Thüm.) I.Miyake (1910)
- Phaeosphaeria celata Shoemaker & C.E.Babc. (1989)
- Phaeosphaeria chiangraina Phook. & K.D.Hyde (2014)
- Phaeosphaeria chinensis K.K.Zhang, S.Hongsanan, Tennakoon & N.Xie (2019)
- Phaeosphaeria cinnae Shoemaker & C.E.Babc. (1989)
- Phaeosphaeria consobrina (P.Karst.) O.E.Erikss. (1967)
- Phaeosphaeria cookei Shoemaker & C.E.Babc. (1989)
- Phaeosphaeria corallorhizae (Peck) M.E.Barr (1986)
- Phaeosphaeria crenata Shoemaker & C.E.Babc. (1989)
- Phaeosphaeria culmorum (Auersw.) Leuchtm. (1984)
- Phaeosphaeria cycadis Wanas., Phookamsak & K.D.Hyde (2019)
- Phaeosphaeria cyperina (Pass.) Shoemaker & C.E.Babc. (1989)
- Phaeosphaeria dennisiana Leuchtm. (1984)
- Phaeosphaeria dryadis Nograsek (1990)
- Phaeosphaeria elaeagni Sawada (1952)
- Phaeosphaeria elymi (Wehm.) Shoemaker & C.E.Babc. (1989)
- Phaeosphaeria emilii Shoemaker & C.E.Babc. (1989)
- Phaeosphaeria epicalamia (Riess) L.Holm (1957)
- Phaeosphaeria equiseti (P.Karst.) L.Holm & K.Holm (1981)
- Phaeosphaeria erikssonii Shoemaker & C.E. Babc. (1989)
- Phaeosphaeria eriobotryae I.Miyake (1913)
- Phaeosphaeria eupatoriicola J.M.Yen (1969)
- Phaeosphaeria eustoma (Fuckel) L.Holm (1957)
- Phaeosphaeria exarata Shoemaker & C.E.Babc. (1989)
- Phaeosphaeria fautreyi Shoemaker & C.E.Babc. (1989)
- Phaeosphaeria fetanensis Shoemaker & C.E.Babc. (1989)
- Phaeosphaeria firmicola Nograsek (1990)
- Phaeosphaeria franklinensis Shoemaker & C.E.Babc. (1989)
- Phaeosphaeria fuckelii (Niessl) L.Holm (1957)
- Phaeosphaeria fuckelioides Otani (1976)
- Phaeosphaeria fusispora Z.F.Zhang, F.Liu & L.Cai (2017)
- Phaeosphaeria gessneri Shoemaker & C.E.Babc. (1989)
- Phaeosphaeria gigaspora Shoemaker & C.E.Babc. (1989)
- Phaeosphaeria glebosoverrucosa Nograsek (1990)
- Phaeosphaeria glyceriae-plicatae (Săvul. & Sandu) Shoemaker & C.E.Babc. (1989)
- Phaeosphaeria graminis (Fuckel) L.Holm (1957)
- Phaeosphaeria guttulata Shoemaker & C.E.Babc. (1989)
- Phaeosphaeria halima (T.W.Johnson) Shoemaker & C.E.Babc. (1989)
- Phaeosphaeria heptamera Shoemaker & C.E.Babc. (1989)
- Phaeosphaeria herpotrichoides (De Not.) L.Holm (1957)
- Phaeosphaeria hesperia M.E.Barr (1992)
- Phaeosphaeria hiemalis (Sacc. & Speg.) Shoemaker & C.E.Babc. (1989)
- Phaeosphaeria hierochloes (Oudem.) O.E.Erikss. (1967)
- Phaeosphaeria humerata Shoemaker & C.E.Babc. (1989)
- Phaeosphaeria huronensis Shoemaker & C.E.Babc. (1989)
- Phaeosphaeria inclusa Shoemaker & C.E.Babc. (1989)
- Phaeosphaeria infuscans (Ellis & Everh.) M.E.Barr (1992)
- Phaeosphaeria insignis (P.Karst.) L.Holm (1957)
- Phaeosphaeria japonica Naito (1952)
- Phaeosphaeria juncicola (Rehm ex G.Winter) L.Holm (1957)
- Phaeosphaeria juncina (Auersw.) L.Holm (1957)
- Phaeosphaeria juncinella (Mouton) Shoemaker & C.E.Babc. (1989)
- Phaeosphaeria juncophila Leuchtm. (1984)
- Phaeosphaeria kukutae G.S.Ridl. (1988)
- Phaeosphaeria kunzeana (Berl.) Khashn. & Shearer (1993)
- Phaeosphaeria larseniana (Munk) Shoemaker & C.E.Babc. (1989)
- Phaeosphaeria laxitunicata Tomilin (1993)
- Phaeosphaeria licatensis (Sacc.) Shoemaker & C.E.Babc. (1989)
- Phaeosphaeria lindii (L.Holm & K.Holm) Leuchtm. (1984)
- Phaeosphaeria livistonae J.Fröhl. & K.D.Hyde (2000)
- Phaeosphaeria lucilla (Sacc.) Huhndorf (1992)
- Phaeosphaeria luctuosa (Niessl ex Sacc.) Y.Otani & Mikawa (1971)
- Phaeosphaeria lunariae Crous & R.K.Schumach. (2016)
- Phaeosphaeria lunata Shoemaker & C.E.Babc. (1989)
- Phaeosphaeria lutea Leuchtm. (1984)
- Phaeosphaeria lycopodiicola (Peck) Shoemaker & C.E.Babc. (1989)
- Phaeosphaeria lycopodina (Mont.) Hedjar. (1969)
- Phaeosphaeria macrosporidium (E.B.G.Jones) Shoemaker & C.E.Babc. (1989)
- Phaeosphaeria marciensis (Peck) L.Holm & K.Holm (1981)
- Phaeosphaeria maritima O.E.Erikss. (1982)
- Phaeosphaeria marram (Cooke) O.E.Erikss. (1967)
- Phaeosphaeria maydis (Henn.) Rane, Payak & Renfro (1967)
- Phaeosphaeria michiganensis Shoemaker & C.E.Babc. (1989)
- Phaeosphaeria microscopica (P.Karst.) O.E.Erikss. (1967)
- Phaeosphaeria minima Shoemaker & C.E.Babc. (1989)
- Phaeosphaeria minuscula (Rehm) Shoemaker & C.E.Babc. (1989)
- Phaeosphaeria moravica Shoemaker & C.E.Babc. (1989)
- Phaeosphaeria mounceae Shoemaker & C.E.Babc. (1989)
- Phaeosphaeria nanosalicium Nograsek (1990)
- Phaeosphaeria nardi (Fr.) L.Holm (1957)
- Phaeosphaeria neomaritima (R.V.Gessner & Kohlm.) Shoemaker & C.E.Babc. (1989)
- Phaeosphaeria nigrans (Roberge ex Desm.) L.Holm (1957)
- Phaeosphaeria nodorum (E.Müll.) Hedjar. (1969)
- Phaeosphaeria nodulispora R.J.V.Oliveira, M.A.Q. Cavalc. & J.L.Bezerra (2016)
- Phaeosphaeria norfolcia (Cooke) Leuchtm. (1984)
- Phaeosphaeria occidentalis (Ellis & Everh.) Shoemaker & C.E.Babc. (1989)
- Phaeosphaeria occulta (Lind) Leuchtm. (1984)
- Phaeosphaeria olivacea Kohlm., Volkm.-Kohlm. & O.E.Erikss. (1997)
- Phaeosphaeria oryzae I.Miyake (1909)
- Phaeosphaeria ovei Shoemaker & C.E.Babc. (1989)
- Phaeosphaeria palmarum Chaudhuri & P.N.Rao (1964)
- Phaeosphaeria panici (Syd.) Shoemaker & C.E.Babc. (1989)
- Phaeosphaeria papayae (Speg.) Quaedvl., Verkley & Crous (2013)
- Phaeosphaeria papua-alpina Otani (1971)
- Phaeosphaeria papyricola (Ellis & Everh.) Huhndorf (1996)
- Phaeosphaeria parvograminis Shoemaker & C.E.Babc. (1989)
- Phaeosphaeria parvula (Niessl) Leuchtm. (1984)
- Phaeosphaeria penniseti Karun., C.H.Kuo & K.D.Hyde (2019)
- Phaeosphaeria petkovicensis (Bubák & Ranoj.) Shoemaker & C.E.Babc. (1989)
- Phaeosphaeria phoenicicola (Crous & Thangavel) Y. Marín & Crous (2019)
- Phaeosphaeria phragmitis (Hollós) Leuchtm. (1984)
- Phaeosphaeria physalidis (Ellis & Everh.) Huhndorf (1996)
- Phaeosphaeria pleurospora (Niessl) Leuchtm. (1984)
- Phaeosphaeria poagena Crous & Quaedvl. (2014)
- Phaeosphaeria podocarpi Crous & A.R.Wood (2014)
- Phaeosphaeria pomona (Sacc.) Huhndorf (1992)
- Phaeosphaeria pontiformis (Fuckel) Leuchtm. (1984)
- Phaeosphaeria pulchra Shoemaker & C.E.Babc. (1989)
- Phaeosphaeria punctillum (Rehm) L.Holm (1957)
- Phaeosphaeria recessa (Pass.) Shoemaker & C.E.Babc. (1989)
- Phaeosphaeria robusta Shoemaker & C.E.Babc. (1989)
- Phaeosphaeria roemeriani Kohlm., Volkm.-Kohlm. & O.E.Erikss. (1998)
- Phaeosphaeria rousseliana (Desm.) L.Holm (1957)
- Phaeosphaeria rubescens Checa & M.E.Barr (1999)
- Phaeosphaeria salebricola (Sacc., E.Bommer & M. Rousseau) Leuchtm. (1984)
- Phaeosphaeria saxonica (Höhn.) Shoemaker & C.E. Babc. (1989)
- Phaeosphaeria scirpicola (Earle) M.E.Barr (1992)
- Phaeosphaeria scotophila (Sacc.) Y.M.Ahn & Shearer (1995)
- Phaeosphaeria sequana (A.L.Guyot) Shoemaker & C.E.Babc. (1989)
- Phaeosphaeria silenes-acaulis (De Not.) L.Holm (1957)
- Phaeosphaeria sinensis Jayasiri, E.B.G.Jones & K.D.Hyde (2019)
- Phaeosphaeria sorghi-arundinacei (Luc) Shoemaker & C.E. Babc. (1989)
- Phaeosphaeria sowerbyi (Fuckel) L.Holm (1957)
- Phaeosphaeria sparsa (Fuckel) Shoemaker & C.E.Babc. (1989)
- Phaeosphaeria spartinae (Ellis & Everh.) Shoemaker & C.E.Babc. (1989)
- Phaeosphaeria spartinicola Leuchtm. (1991)
- Phaeosphaeria sporoboli (Ellis & Galloway) Huhndorf (1996)
- Phaeosphaeria stellariae (Rostr.) Leuchtm. (1984)
- Phaeosphaeria stipae Tomilin (1987)
- Phaeosphaeria subalpina (Bubák) Shoemaker & C.E.Babc. (1989)
- Phaeosphaeria sylvatica (Pass.) Hedjar. (1969)
- Phaeosphaeria tenuispora Scheuer (1988)
- Phaeosphaeria thomasiana (Sacc. & Roum.) Huhndorf (1992)
- Phaeosphaeria thorae (Jaap) Y.M.Ahn & Shearer (1995)
- Phaeosphaeria thysanolaenicola Phook. & K.D.Hyde (2014)
- Phaeosphaeria tini (Ellis & Everh.) Huhndorf (1996)
- Phaeosphaeria tofieldiae (E.Müll.) Leuchtm. (1984)
- Phaeosphaeria tricincta Shoemaker & C.E.Babc. (1989)
- Phaeosphaeria triglochinicola (Curr.) Leuchtm. (1984)
- Phaeosphaeria variiseptata (G.L.Stout) Shoemaker & C.E.Babc. (1989)
- Phaeosphaeria vilasensis Fallah, Shearer & Leuchtm. (1999)
- Phaeosphaeria viridella (Peck) Leuchtm. (1984)
- Phaeosphaeria volkartiana (E.Müll.) Hedjar. (1969)
- Phaeosphaeria weberi (Oudem.) L.Holm & K.Holm (1994)
