= Drechslera leaf spot =

Plant fungal disease

Drechslera leaf spot is a fungal disease of turfgrass caused by several species of Drechslera.

== Symptoms ==
The symptoms of Drechslera leaf spot are mostly small, dark-brown, or purplish spots on the leaves. The spots eventually expand and become lighter-brown or ashy in the middle (usually having dark margins around the center). Once the spots run together, girdling of the entire leaf blade occurs. Warm weather induces crown rot and eventual wilt will occur from the root destruction.

== Disease cycle ==
The disease cycle starts with fungi overwintering in leaf and plant clippings/debris of infected grass plants. Spores are produced and can be dispersed through wind and rain splash, machines, and many other mechanisms, although clippings and debris are the main source of the inoculum. Spores germinate with free moisture on the leaf and eventually infect to form lesions (mainly in spring and autumn). The disease severity is dependent on weather, wetter and warmer weather is usually favorable to the pathogen. Dry weather in the summer reduces the ability of infection and crown rot begins. This causes a reduction in vigor and drought tolerance, eventually leading to the grass “melting out” (yellowing of the host) and dying.

== Management ==
There are many ways to try and manage Drechslera leaf spot. The most favorable would be to find a resistant plant variety. Other ways include collecting fallen leaves in order to reduce inoculum from plant debris, as well as pruning to increase air circulation for the grasses (a reduction in moisture is unfavorable to the pathogen). Another important factor to consider is when to handle the plants. They should not be handled when the foliage is wet and it is advised to avoid overhead watering. Fertilizing on the basis of a soil test may also improve and maintain the vigor of the plants. Fungicides may be applied, but they should be applied before the first sign of infection and continued through the susceptible period. This may be harder and less ideal for farmers to implement.
