= Drechslera andersenii =

Scientific classification
- Domain: Eukaryota
- Kingdom: Fungi
- Division: Ascomycota
- Class: Dothideomycetes
- Order: Pleosporales
- Family: Pleosporaceae
- Genus: Drechslera
- Species: D. andersenii

Binomial name
- Drechslera andersenii A. Lam (1986)

Synonyms
- Drechslera andersenii Scharif, Studies on Graminicolous Species of Helminthosporium (Tehran): 29 (1963)

Fungal plant pathogen

Drechslera andersenii is a fungus that is a plant pathogen. It was originally found on the leaves of Lolium perenne (perennial ryegrass) in Great Britain. It was also found on Italian ryegrass.

It was found in China in 2018.
