= Rathayibacter =

Scientific classification
- Domain: Bacteria
- Kingdom: Bacillati
- Phylum: Actinomycetota
- Class: Actinomycetes
- Order: Micrococcales
- Family: Microbacteriaceae
- Genus: Rathayibacter; Zgurskaya et al. 1993

Type species
- Rathayibacter rathayi (Smith 1913) Zgurskaya et al. 1993

Species
- R. agropyri Schroeder et al. 2018; R. caricis Dorofeeva et al. 2002; R. festucae Dorofeeva et al. 2002; R. iranicus (Carlson and Vidaver 1982) Zgurskaya et al. 1993; R. oskolensis Dorofeeva et al. 2018; R. rathayi (Smith 1913) Zgurskaya et al. 1993; "R. tanaceti" Vasilenko et al. 2016; R. toxicus (Riley and Ophel 1992) Sasaki et al. 1998; R. tritici (Carlson and Vidaver 1982) Zgurskaya et al. 1993

Genus of bacteria

Rathayibacter is a genus of bacteria of the order Actinomycetales which are gram-positive soil organisms.
