= Drechslera musae-sapientium =

Scientific classification
- Domain: Eukaryota
- Kingdom: Fungi
- Division: Ascomycota
- Class: Dothideomycetes
- Order: Pleosporales
- Family: Pleosporaceae
- Genus: Drechslera
- Species: D. musae-sapientium

Binomial name
- Drechslera musae-sapientium (Hansf.) M.B. Ellis [as "musae-sapientum"], (1971)

Species of fungus

Drechslera musae-sapientium is a plant pathogen.
