= Mastrevirus =

Virus classification
- (unranked): Virus
- Realm: Floreoviria
- Kingdom: Shotokuvirae
- Phylum: Cressdnaviricota
- Class: Repensiviricetes
- Order: Geplafuvirales
- Family: Geminiviridae
- Genus: Mastrevirus

Genus of viruses

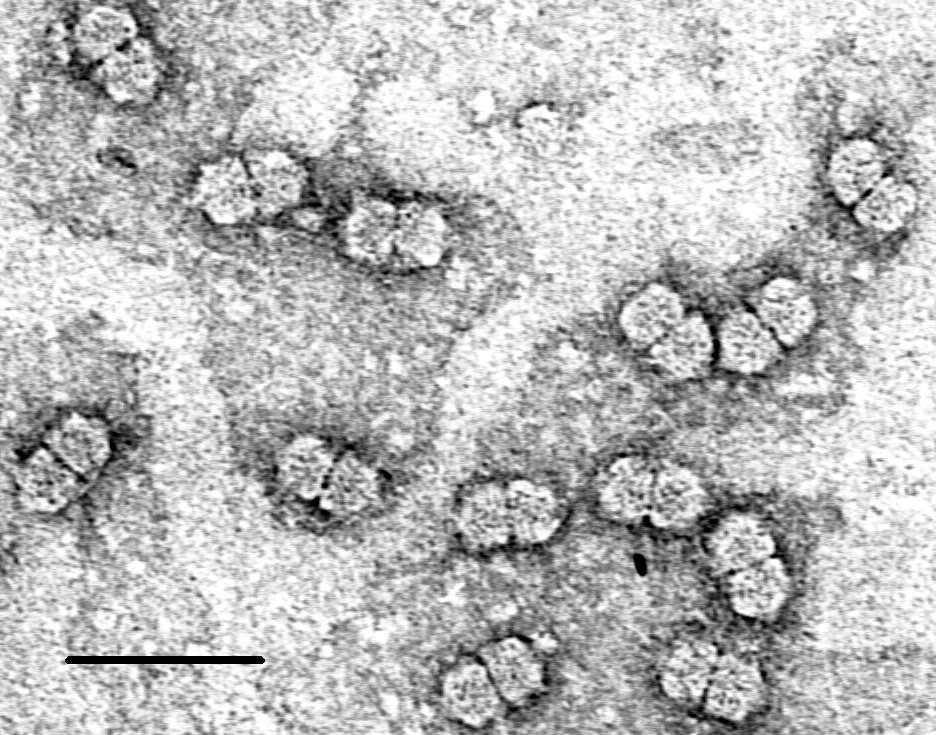
Maize streak virus. Picture taken by Kassie Kasdorf, presently at Plant Protection Research Institute, Pretoria, for the University of Cape Town.

Mastrevirus is a genus of ssDNA viruses, in the family Geminiviridae. Mostly monocotyledonous plants serve as natural hosts. They are vectored by planthoppers. There are 55 species in this genus. Diseases associated with this genus include: maize streak virus: maize streak disease (MSD).

== Capsid proteins ==
Mastreviruses have an unusually diverse range of capsid proteins among the Geminiviridae. While all other genera have species with essentially identical proteins (and their producing genetic sequences) among themselves, Mastrevirus has seven protein clusters and three species that each constitute their own.

== Structure ==
Viruses in Mastrevirus are non-enveloped, with icosahedral geometries, and T=1 symmetry. The diameter is around 22 nm, with a length of 38 nm. Genomes are circular and non-segmented, around 2.6-2.8kb in length.

| Genus | Structure | Symmetry | Capsid | Genomic arrangement | Genomic segmentation |
|---|---|---|---|---|---|
| Mastrevirus | Twinned Icosahedral | Incomplete T=1 | Non-enveloped | Circular | Monopartite |

== Life cycle ==
Viral replication is nuclear. Entry into the host cell is achieved by penetration into the host cell. Replication follows the ssDNA rolling circle model. DNA-templated transcription is the method of transcription. The virus exits the host cell by nuclear pore export, and tubule-guided viral movement. Mostly monocotyledonous plants serve as the natural host. The virus is transmitted via a vector (leafhopper). Transmission routes are vector and mechanical.

| Genus | Host details | Tissue tropism | Entry details | Release details | Replication site | Assembly site | Transmission |
|---|---|---|---|---|---|---|---|
| Mastrevirus | Dicots | None | Viral movement; mechanical inoculation | Budding | Nucleus | Nucleus | Leafhopper |

== Taxonomy ==
The genus contains the following species, listed by scientific name and followed by the exemplar virus of the species:

- Mastrevirus arietini, Chickpea chlorosis Australia virus
- Mastrevirus avenae, Oat dwarf virus
- Mastrevirus axonopi, Axonopus compressus streak virus
- Mastrevirus bothriochloae, Bothriochloa barbinodis associated virus
- Mastrevirus bourbonense, Maize streak Reunion virus
- Mastrevirus brachypodiumprimi, Brachypodium phoenicoides associated virus 1
- Mastrevirus brachypodiumsecundi, Brachypodium phoenicoides associated virus 2
- Mastrevirus bromi, Bromus catharticus striate mosaic virus
- Mastrevirus cenchri, Cenchrus echinatus associated virus
- Mastrevirus chloris, Chloris striate mosaic virus
- Mastrevirus cicerosis, Chickpea chlorosis virus
- Mastrevirus cicerparvi, Chickpea chlorotic dwarf virus
- Mastrevirus ciliaris, Digitaria ciliaris striate mosaic virus
- Mastrevirus croci, Mastrevirus sp. croci
- Mastrevirus didactylae, Digitaria didactyla striate mosaic virus
- Mastrevirus digitariae, Digitaria streak virus
- Mastrevirus dilatati, Paspalum dilatatum striate mosaic virus
- Mastrevirus eleusinae, Eleusine indica associated virus
- Mastrevirus eragrostis, Eragrostis streak virus
- Mastrevirus eragrostisminoris, Eragrostis minor streak virus
- Mastrevirus erythrodiplaxis, Dragonfly-associated mastrevirus virus
- Mastrevirus flavaparvi, Chickpea yellow dwarf virus
- Mastrevirus flavi, Chickpea yellows virus
- Mastrevirus fulleri, Maize streak dwarfing virus
- Mastrevirus hordei, Wheat dwarf virus
- Mastrevirus ipomoeae, Sweet potato symptomless virus 1
- Mastrevirus melenis, Melenis repens associated virus
- Mastrevirus mexicoense, Mastrevirus sp. UHMV-1.PC-W
- Mastrevirus miscanthi, Miscanthus streak virus
- Mastrevirus nomiae, Nomiamastrel virus
- Mastrevirus oryzaprimi, Rice latent virus 1
- Mastrevirus oryzasecundi, Rice latent virus 2
- Mastrevirus panici, Panicum streak virus
- Mastrevirus paspali, Paspalum striate mosaic virus
- Mastrevirus purpurei, Cenchrus purpureus mild streak virus
- Mastrevirus rubrumprimi, Chickpea redleaf virus
- Mastrevirus rubrumsecundi, Chickpea redleaf virus 2
- Mastrevirus sacchari, Saccharum streak virus
- Mastrevirus saccharofficinari, Sugarcane streak virus
- Mastrevirus saccharumalbusvenae, Sugarcane white streak virus
- Mastrevirus saccharumbourbonense, Sugarcane streak Reunion virus
- Mastrevirus saccharumegyptense, Sugarcane streak Egypt virus
- Mastrevirus saccharumpallidi, Sugarcane chlorotic streak virus
- Mastrevirus saccharumstriati, Sugarcane striate virus
- Mastrevirus sorghi, Sorghum arundinaceum associated virus
- Mastrevirus sporoboprimi, Sporolobus striate mosaic virus 1
- Mastrevirus sporobosecundi, Sporolobus striate mosaic virus 2
- Mastrevirus storeyi, Maize streak virus
- Mastrevirus striatis, Maize striate mosaic virus
- Mastrevirus tabaci, Tobacco yellow dwarf virus
- Mastrevirus tripterygii, Tripterygium mastrevirus A
- Mastrevirus tritici, Wheat dwarf India virus
- Mastrevirus urochloae, Urochloa streak virus
- Mastrevirus urochloareunionense, Urochloa decumbens associated virus
- Mastrevirus virgati, Switchgrass mosaic-associated virus
