= Geocenamus brevidens =

Scientific classification
- Kingdom: Animalia
- Phylum: Nematoda
- Class: Chromadorea
- Order: Rhabditida
- Family: Merliniidae
- Genus: Geocenamus
- Species: G. brevidens

Binomial name
- Geocenamus brevidens (Allen, 1955) Brzeski, 1991

Synonyms
- Merlinius brevidens (Allen, 1955) Siddiqi, 1970; Tylenchorhynchus brevidens Allen, 1955

Species of nematode worm

Geocenamus brevidens is a plant pathogenic nematode infecting barley and sorghum.

== See also ==
- List of barley diseases
- List of sorghum diseases
