= Meloidogyne naasi =

Scientific classification
- Kingdom: Animalia
- Phylum: Nematoda
- Class: Secernentea
- Order: Tylenchida
- Family: Heteroderidae
- Genus: Meloidogyne
- Species: M. naasi

Binomial name
- Meloidogyne naasi Franklin, 1965

Species of nematode worm

Meloidogyne naasi, the barley root-knot nematode or cereal root-knot nematode, is a plant pathogenic nematode, and also an invasive species. The nematode occurs as the primary root-knot pathogen on golf courses and turf in the Northeast United States, although it is unclear as to whether the pathogen is native or introduced. In 2019 it was reported damaging cereal and grass crops in Northern Ireland.

== See also ==
- List of barley diseases
- List of oat diseases
