= Turf melting out =

Scientific classification
- Domain: Eukaryota
- Kingdom: Fungi
- Division: Ascomycota
- Class: Dothideomycetes
- Order: Pleosporales
- Family: Pleosporaceae
- Genus: Drechslera
- Species: D. poae

Binomial name
- Drechslera poae (Baudyš) Shoemaker 1959

Synonyms
- Helminthosporium poae Baudyš 1916

Turfgrass disease caused by the pathogen Dreshlera poae

Turf melting out is caused by the fungal pathogen Drechslera poae, in the family Pleosporaceae. It is a common problem on turfgrass and affects many different species. The disease infects all parts of the plant most commonly on golf course roughs, sports fields, and home lawns. There are two stages of the disease: the leaf blade infection and the crown and root infection Melting out occurs during the cool weather of April and May and is encouraged by high nitrogen fertility. The disease is spread by wind-blown or water splashed spores that survive in thatch.

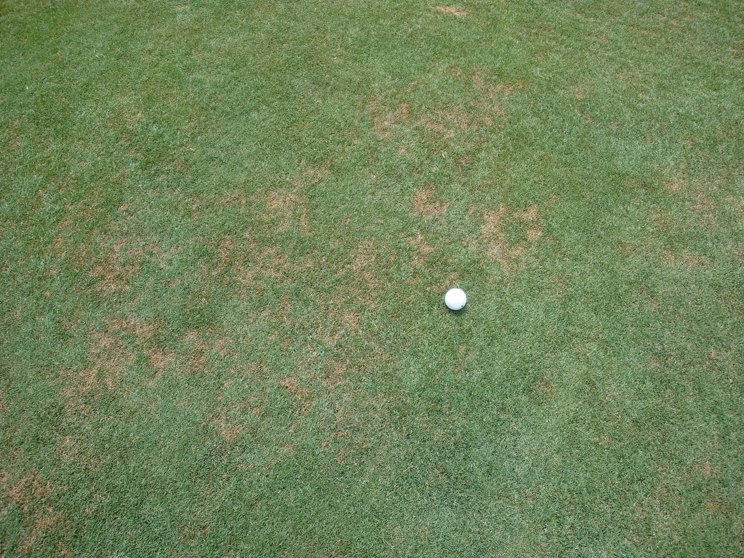
Turf melting out on a bentgrass putting green

== Hosts ==
Drechslera poae thrives during spring conditions and affects many cool season turfgrass species such as bluegrasses (Poa spp.), bentgrasses (Agrostis spp.), ryegrasses (Lolium spp.), and fescues (Festuca spp.). Outbreaks are most common on golf course fairways and residential lawns consisting primarily of Kentucky bluegrass (Poa pratensis). However, newly seeded lawns and certain cultivars of Kentucky bluegrass are particularly susceptible. Some of the most susceptible cultivars include 'Kenblue', 'Mermaid', and 'Bar VV 0665'. This pathogen has also been known to attack a warm season grass, buffalograss (Buchloe dactyloides).

== Symptoms ==
Turf melting out begins as black to purple spots on the leaf blades. These spots eventually appear on the leaf sheaths. The fungus then begin to move down and invade the crowns and the roots of the plants. From far away, the turf appears yellow or blackish brown. The colors that appear on the turf directly reflect the nitrogen levels in the plant. When turfgrass has low levels of nitrogen it turns yellow and when it has high nitrogen levels, it turns blackish brown. As the disease progresses, the infected turf becomes thin and brown. These symptoms are related to wilted turf. Unless the turfgrass is properly treated by fungicides, the grass will be replaced by broadleaf weeds and invasive grasses.

== Signs ==
The Drechslera poae pathogen is characterized by hyaline to buff-colored mycelium. The conidia are olive-brown to dark-brown and the conidiophores are light yellow-brown.

== Disease cycle ==
Drechslera poae fungus overwinters on the lower portion of the grass plant in the crowns and roots. Survival in winter is by conidia and dormant mycelia in infected live plant tissue and saprophytically in dead tissue, such as thatch and mat. The pathogen has also been known to overwinter in the dead thatch layer under the turfgrass. Once spring arrives with cool, wet weather, the fungus begins to thrive. Sporulation then occurs on the infected leaves and continues to reproduce as long as the cool, wet conditions persist. When the spores are released, splashing water from rain or irrigation transfer them to new healthy plants. After weeks of germination, spores tend to wash down to the crown and root areas which eventually induces the melting out phase of the turf by late spring or early summer.

== Environment ==
The following environmental conditions are crucial for turf melting out to thrive:

- 50–60 °F (10–16 °C)
- High humidity
- Presence of healthy and lush grass hosts

Minimal amounts of pathogen growth can occur on healthy turf whenever there is continuous leaf wetness. Survival of the pathogen is dependent on how wet the conditions are either from irrigation or rain events. Once there is a prolonged period of moisture present along with cool temperatures, the disease will be more likely to cause significant damage to a turf stand.

== Management ==
There are several ways to manage turf melting out. They include both cultural and chemical.

=== Cultural ===
The best way to control melting out in golf course roughs is to use a resistant cultivar. Using cheap common cultivars will make the plant susceptible. Several cultivar names are; 'Avid', 'Empire', 'Everglade', 'Midnight', 'Moonlight', 'Total Eclipse'. Since melting out likes lush, nitrogen-filled plants, making sure there is not a large application of nitrogen in spring is important to reduce the risk of infection. In turn, a nitrogen-hungry plant is weak, also making it susceptible, so a good fertility plan is key in reducing risk of a melting out outbreak. Water management is another way to help control melting out. There is evidence that keeping thatch moist can reduce sporulation, but keeping leaf wetness down is also important If there is a history of melting out in certain areas. Also it is important to avoid irrigation during cool wet rainy periods. Lastly it is important to have a consistent practice of aeration and topdressing to reduce thatch in the grass.

=== Chemical ===
Fungicides are an effective control method if cultural management practices do not work. The fungicides should be applied post emergence once the disease occurs. The disease is very difficult to control once the crown rot or melting out phase has begun.

Fungicide	Class	Trade Name
Chlorothalonil	Nitrile	Daconil, Chlorostar, Chlorothalonil, Echo, Legend, Manicure, Pegasus
Azoxystrobin	QOI	Heritage
Propiconozale	DMI	Banner MAXX, Kestrel, Kestrel MEX, ProPensity, Propiconazole
Tebuconazole	DMI	Torque

== Importance ==
Golf courses affect the United States economy with about 18 billion dollars annually. Turf melting out is an important disease economically for golf course superintendents. When turfgrass quality is affected on a golf course, the course has a potential to lose golfers, in turn, losing money. After a golf course has an outbreak of turf melting out, the damage needs to be assessed and the turf needs to be replaced. Mending these damaged areas cost money from the fungicide applications to rid the area of the disease to the replacement of turf. Simple cultural controls help reduce the risk of this disease, but when the methods are not used, it can be costly.
