= Winter wheat Russian mosaic virus =

Virus classification
- (unranked): Virus
- Realm: Riboviria
- Kingdom: Orthornavirae
- Phylum: Negarnaviricota
- Class: Monjiviricetes
- Order: Mononegavirales
- Family: Rhabdoviridae
- Genus: Cytorhabdovirus
- Species: Cytorhabdovirus gramineae (?)
- Strain: Winter wheat Russian mosaic virus

Species of virus

Winter wheat Russian mosaic virus (WWRMV) is a plant pathogenic virus. It is probably a strain of the species Cytorhabdovirus gramineae. It is one of the most common causes of viral disease of wheat in the Volga region of Russia.
