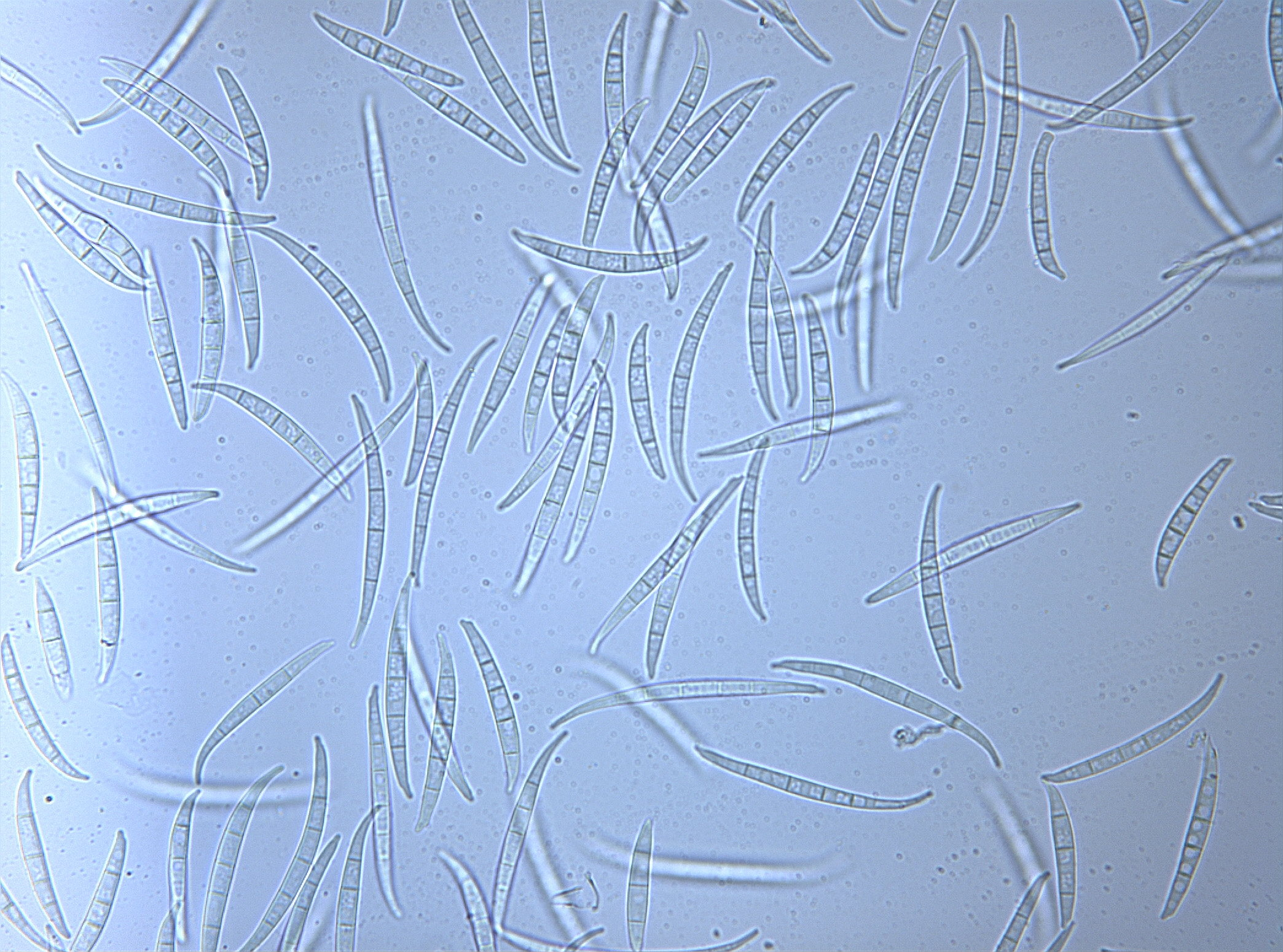
- Macroconidia of Gibberella avenacea

Scientific classification
- Kingdom: Fungi
- Division: Ascomycota
- Class: Sordariomycetes
- Order: Hypocreales
- Family: Nectriaceae
- Genus: Gibberella
- Species: G. avenacea

Binomial name
- Gibberella avenacea R.J. Cook (1967)

Synonyms
- Fusarium avenaceum; Fusarium avenaceum f. fabae; Fusarium avenaceum var. fabae; Fusarium herbarum var. avenaceum; Fusisporium avenaceum

= Gibberella avenacea =

Species of fungus

Gibberella avenacea is a fungus that infects plants.

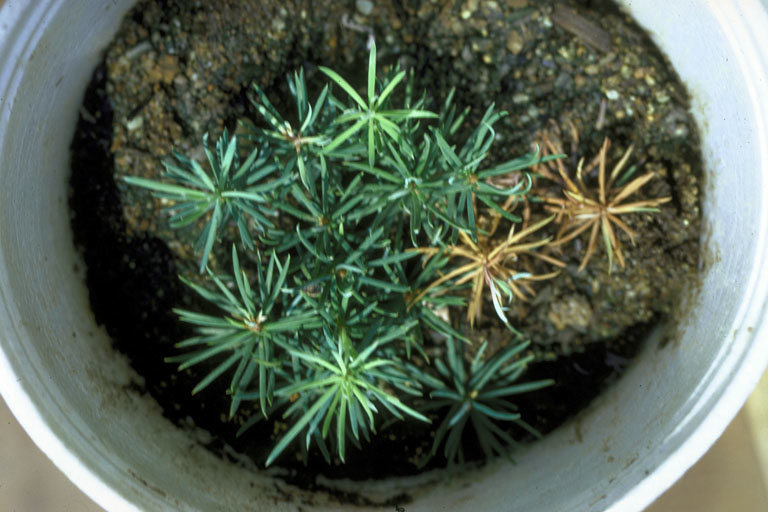
Fusarium cortical stem rot
