= Rice grassy stunt virus =

Virus classification
- (unranked): Virus
- Realm: Riboviria
- Kingdom: Orthornavirae
- Phylum: Negarnaviricota
- Class: Bunyaviricetes
- Order: Hareavirales
- Family: Phenuiviridae
- Genus: Tenuivirus
- Species: Tenuivirus oryzabrevis

Synonyms
- Rice grassy stunt tenuivirus; rice rosette Philippines virus; probably rice rosette virus

Species of virus

Rice grassy stunt virus (RGSV) is a plant pathogenic virus transmitted by the brown planthopper, Nilaparvata lugens, and two other Nilaparvata species, N. bakeri and N. muiri.

The virus is found in South and Southeast Asia, China, Japan, and Taiwan. From 1970 to 1977, RGSV incidence was high in Indonesia. Outbreaks occurred in the Philippines from 1973 to 1977 and again from 1982 to 1983. There was significant crop loss from RGSV in parts of India in 1972–74, 1978, 1981, and 1984. High levels of RGSV were reported in Kyushu, Japan in 1978.

From 2000 to 2008, the Mekong Delta of Vietnam experienced major crop losses of rice as RGSV and rice ragged stunt virus, also vectored by N. lugens, occurred together.
