= Phaeosphaeria microscopica =

Scientific classification
- Domain: Eukaryota
- Kingdom: Fungi
- Division: Ascomycota
- Class: Dothideomycetes
- Order: Pleosporales
- Family: Phaeosphaeriaceae
- Genus: Phaeosphaeria
- Species: P. microscopica

Binomial name
- Phaeosphaeria microscopica (P.Karst.) O.E.Erikss. (1967)

Synonyms
- Heptameria microscopica (P.Karst.) Cooke; Leptosphaeria culmorum; Leptosphaeria microscopica P.Karst. (1872)

Species of fungus

Phaeosphaeria microscopica is a fungal plant pathogen that infects wheat. The disease it causes is known as microscopica leaf spot.
