= European wheat striate mosaic virus =

Virus classification
- (unranked): Virus
- Realm: Riboviria
- Kingdom: Orthornavirae
- Phylum: Negarnaviricota
- Class: Bunyaviricetes
- Order: Hareavirales
- Family: Phenuiviridae
- Genus: Tenuivirus
- Species: Tenuivirus eurotritici

Synonyms
- European striate mosaic virus oat striate and red disease virus

Species of virus

European wheat striate mosaic virus (EWSMV) is a plant pathogenic virus of the genus Tenuivirus.
