= Hymenula =

Scientific classification
- Kingdom: Fungi
- Division: Ascomycota
- Class: incertae sedis
- Order: incertae sedis
- Family: incertae sedis
- Genus: Hymenula; Fr., 1825

Genus of fungi

Hymenula is a genus of fungi with unknown classification.

The genus has cosmopolitan distribution.

== Species ==
Species:

- Hymenula aciculosa Ellis & Harkn.
- Hymenula antherici Hollós
- Hymenula anthrisci Briard ex Sacc.
