= Barley stripe rust =

Puccinia striiformis f.sp. hordei

Scientific classification
- Domain: Eukaryota
- Kingdom: Fungi
- Division: Basidiomycota
- Class: Pucciniomycetes
- Order: Pucciniales
- Family: Pucciniaceae
- Genus: Puccinia
- Species: P. striiformis
- Forma specialis: P. s. f.sp. hordei

Trionomial name
- Puccinia striiformis f.sp. hordei

Fungal disease of barley

Stripe rust
- Causal agents: Puccinia striiformis f. sp. hordei
- Hosts: barley
- EPPO Code: PUCCST
- Distribution: United States (Idaho, Washington, Oregon)

Barley stripe rust is a fungal disease of barley caused by Puccinia striiformis f. sp. hordei. a forma specialis of Puccinia striiformis. It was first detected in the United States in 1991, in northern and eastern Idaho in 1993, In 1995 it was detected for the first time in western Washington and western Oregon and is currently considered to be well established there. The disease initially develops at a small loci within a field and spreads rapidly and has caused significant losses in areas where climatic conditions are cool and wet.

== Symptoms ==
Infections produce linear, orange-yellow pustules appear on leaves and/or heads. As the disease progresses, pustules coalesce to form long stripes between leaf veins. On susceptible cultivars, entire leaf blades may be covered with pustules. The black spore stage develops as linear black pustules covered by the leaf epidermis.

== Disease cycle ==
Puccinia striiformis f. sp. hordei, is an obligate parasite that overseasons on volunteer barley or rye, certain wild barleys such as Hordeum jubatum (foxtail barley), wheat, and numerous perennial grass species.

The disease begins from a very small number of infections that are difficult or impossible to detect in the field. Spread of the pathogen can be explosive and cause significant losses, especially in the Pacific Northwest where cool, wet weather greatly favors disease development.

== Management ==
The disease can be managed by growing disease resistant cultivars. Foliar fungicides may be required when growing a susceptible cultivars.
