= Ichiro Miyake =

Japanese mycologist

Ichiro Miyake (三宅 市郎, Miyake Ichirō; March 24, 1881 in Kushihara, Gifu – February 15, 1964 in Ōta, Tokyo) was a Japanese mycologist.
