= Rathayibacter tritici =

Scientific classification
- Domain: Bacteria
- Kingdom: Bacillati
- Phylum: Actinomycetota
- Class: Actinomycetes
- Order: Micrococcales
- Family: Microbacteriaceae
- Genus: Rathayibacter
- Species: R. tritici

Binomial name
- Rathayibacter tritici (Carlson and Vidaver 1982) Zgurskaya et al. 1993

Type strain
- ATCC 11403; CCUG 23914; CFBP 1385; CIP 104038; DSM 7486; ICMP 2626; JCM 9309; LMG 3728; NCPPB 1857; VKM Ac-1603

Synonyms
- Clavibacter tritici (Carlson and Vidaver 1982) Davis et al. 1984; Corynebacterium tritici (Hutchinson 1917) Burkholder 1948; Corynebacterium tritici (ex Hutchinson 1917) Carlson and Vidaver 1982; Pseudomonas tritici Hutchinson 1917

Species of bacterium

Rathayibacter tritici is a Gram-positive soil bacterium. It is a plant pathogen and causes spike blight in wheat.
