= Rice stripe virus =

Virus classification
- (unranked): Virus
- Realm: Riboviria
- Kingdom: Orthornavirae
- Phylum: Negarnaviricota
- Class: Bunyaviricetes
- Order: Hareavirales
- Family: Phenuiviridae
- Genus: Tenuivirus
- Species: Tenuivirus oryzaclavatae

Synonyms
- Rice stripe tenuivirus

Species of virus

Rice stripe virus is a pathogenic plant virus of the genus Tenuivirus. It is prevalent in Japan, China, and Korea and can infect plants of the family Poaceae, which include wheat and corn (see maize stripe virus). Damage from this disease causes major reductions in rice crop yield every year.

It is spread primarily by Laodelphax striatellus, a small planthopper that feeds and damages rice plants by sap-sucking. Three other planthopper insects that transmit rice stripe virus include Unkanodes sapporona, Unkanodoes albifascia, and Terthron albovittatum. The virus propagates in the planthopper and is passed down to 90% of a female's eggs. However, mechanically transmitting the virus by injecting sap from an affected plant to a healthy plant has not been widely successful.

== Symptoms ==
Rice plants are susceptible to infection starting at the seedling age. The only known means of virus transmission is via planthoppers. Typical symptoms of rice stripe virus infection include pale and discontinuous yellow stripes, blotches, and dead tissue streaks on the leaves. Severe infections cause grey necrotic streaks and result in the death of the plant.

=== Young plants ===
Infection causes the most damage during seedling stage to maximum tillering stage because during this time interval, the plants are at a higher risk of death. Affected seedlings are stunted in growth with leaves that elongate without unfolding. Their color pales to white with drooped, curled, dead leaves. In Japan, this disease was called "Yurei Byo" (ghost disease) because of these symptoms. If the plants grow, they produce few, if any, tillers and panicles with empty spikelets.

=== Mature plants ===
Infected mature plants do not have severe chlorosis or blotches, but ripening may be hindered. They can still produce rice, but with less vigor.

== Structure ==
The virus is made up of four ssRNA segments, seven open reading frames, a nucleocapsid protein, and an RNA polymerase protein. It is 8 nm in diameter and 500-2000 nm long.

- RNA 1: This is the largest ssRNA segment with 8970 nucleotides. RNA 1 is negative sense and encodes a protein that is part of the RNA polymerase.
- RNA 2 and RNA 4: These strands are ambisense.
- RNA 3: Encodes for gene silencing suppressor proteins and nucleocapsid proteins.

== Epidemics ==
This table from KnowledgeBank.irri.org summarizes reported epidemics of rice stripe virus.

Year	Country	Area Affected (ha)	Reference
1960s	Japan	500,000	Maeda et al. (2006)
1960s	Eastern and Southern China	2,660,000	Wang et al. (2008)
1963-67	Japan	500,000 to 620,000 annually	Nemoto et al. (1994)
1973	Japan	620,000	Ou (1985)
1973	Taiwan	1,045	Lee (1975)
1986	Japan	170,000	Nemoto et al. (1994)
Not indicated	Yunnan Province, China	67,000	Wang et al. (2008)
2002	Jiangsu Province, China	780,000	Wei et al. (2009)
2003	Jiangsu Province, China	957,000	Wei et al. (2009)
2004	Jiangsu Province, China	1,571,000	Wei et al. (2009)
2005-06	Zhejiang Province, China	100,000	Wang et al. (2008)
2007	Zhejiang Province, China	17,600	Zhu et al. (2009)
2007-08	Korea	84% of rice fields	Jonson et al. (2009)

== Prevention ==
The lowland rice plants in Japan (japonica-type) are easily afflicted by rice stripe virus: however, upland japonica-type, indica-type, and Javanese varieties are resistant genetically. Hybrid varieties Chugoku 31 and St No1 were bred in Japan by crossing japonica-type cv. Norin No 8 with indica-type Modan. The offspring of this cross was then crossed with cv. Norin 8. Chugoku 31 and St No1 have been used to breed different varieties of rice stripe virus resistant rice plants in Japan.

Since the 1950s, Japanese rice farmers have adopted the practice of planting rice early in the season. This allows the plants to grow past the tillering stage by the time planthoppers immigrate from wheat and barley plants.

== Bibliography ==
- Castilla, NP; S. Savary; A. Sparks; IR Choi (2009). "Rice Stripe". International Rice Research Institute. Archived from the original on 15 April 2013.
- Gingery, Roy; Lowell Nault; Shuichi Yamashita (23 March 1983). "Relationship Between Maize Stripe Virus and Rice Stripe Virus". Journal of General Virology. 64 (8): 1765–1770. doi:10.1099/0022-1317-64-8-1765.
- "Rice Stripe Tenuvirus (Rice Stripe Virus)". Plantwise.
- "Rice Stripe Virus". Rothamsted Research. June 2000.
- Toriyama, Shigemitsu; Mami Takahashi; Yoshitaka Sano; Takumi Shimizu; Akira Ishihama (1994). "Nucleotide sequence of RNA 1, the largest genomic segment of rice stripe virus, the prototype of the tenuiviruses". Journal of General Virology. 75 (12): 3569–3579. doi:10.1099/0022-1317-75-12-3569. PMID 7996149.
- Wei, Tai-Yun; Jin-Guang Yang; Fu-Long Liao; Fang-Luan Gao; Lian-Ming Lu; Xiao-Ting Zhang; Fan Li; Zu-Jian Wu; Qi-Yin Lin; Lian-Hui Xie; Han-Xin Lin (29 December 2008). "Genetic diversity and population structure of rice stripe virus in China" (PDF). Journal of General Virology. 90 (4): 1025–1034. doi:10.1099/vir.0.006858-0. PMID 19264655.
- Xiong, Ruyi; Jianxiang Wu; Yijun Zhou; Xueping Zhou (2008). "Identification of a Movement Protein of the Tenuvirus Rice Stripe Virus". Journal of Virology. 82 (24): 12304–2311. doi:10.1128/jvi.01696-08. PMC 2593352. PMID 18818319.
- Zhang, Fugie; Hongyan Guo; Tong Zhou; Yijun Zhou; Shengyue Wang (13 May 2010). "Massively Parallel Pyrosequencing-based Transcriptome Analyses of Small Brown Planthopper (Laodelphax Striatellus), a Vector Insect Transmitting Rice Stripe Virus (RSV)" (PDF). BMC Genomics.
