= Sclerophthora rayssiae =

Scientific classification
- Domain: Eukaryota
- Clade: Sar
- Clade: Stramenopiles
- Phylum: Oomycota
- Class: Peronosporomycetes
- Order: Peronosporales
- Family: Peronosporaceae
- Genus: Sclerophthora
- Species: S. rayssiae

Binomial name
- Sclerophthora rayssiae R.G. Kenneth, Koltin & I. Wahl (1964)

Species of single-celled organism

Sclerophthora rayssiae is a plant pathogen which infects maize and barley.
