= Wheat yellow mosaic virus =

Virus classification
- (unranked): Virus
- Realm: Riboviria
- Kingdom: Orthornavirae
- Phylum: Pisuviricota
- Class: Stelpaviricetes
- Order: Patatavirales
- Family: Potyviridae
- Genus: Bymovirus
- Species: Bymovirus triticitessellati

Synonyms
- Soil-borne wheat yellow mosaic virus

Species of virus

Wheat yellow mosaic virus is a plant pathogenic virus of the family Potyviridae.
