= Phaeosphaeria avenaria f.sp. triticae =

Scientific classification
- Kingdom: Fungi
- Division: Ascomycota
- Class: Dothideomycetes
- Order: Pleosporales
- Family: Phaeosphaeriaceae
- Genus: Phaeosphaeria
- Species: P. avenaria
- Forma specialis: P. a. f.sp. triticae

Trionomial name
- Phaeosphaeria avenaria f.sp. triticae Shoemaker & C.E. Babc. (1989)

Synonyms
- Leptosphaeria avenaria f.sp. triticea T.W. Johnson (1947); Leptosphaeria tritici (Garov.) Pass. (1878); Phaeosphaeria tritici (Garov.) Hedjar. (1969); Pleospora tritici Garov., (1874); Septoria avenae f.sp. triticea J. Johnson (1947)

Fungal plant pathogen

Phaeosphaeria avenaria f.sp. triticae is a plant pathogen infecting barley and wheat.
