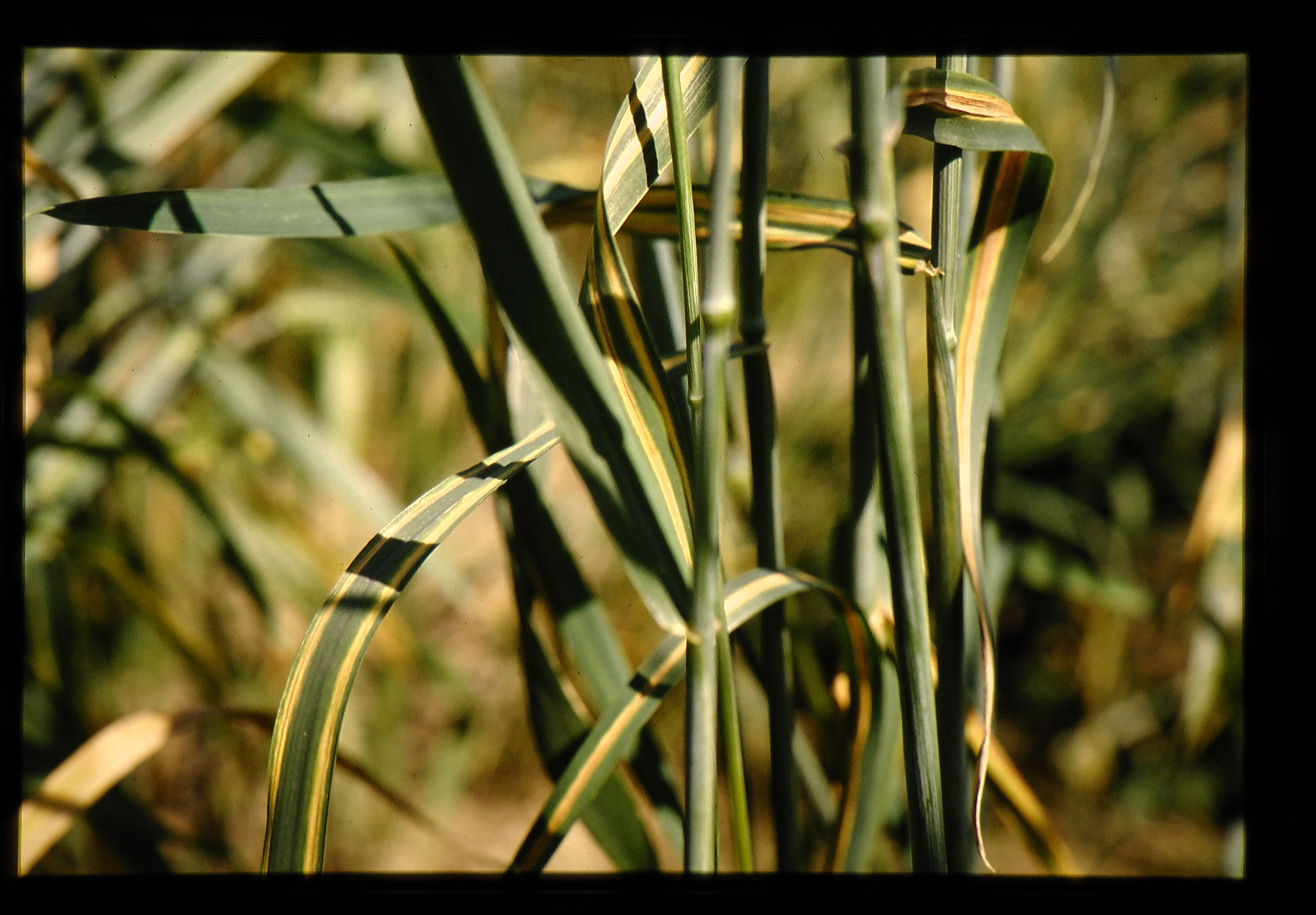
- Cephalosporium gramineum

Scientific classification
- Kingdom: Fungi
- Division: Ascomycota
- Class: incertae sedis
- Order: incertae sedis
- Family: incertae sedis
- Genus: Hymenula
- Species: H. cerealis

Binomial name
- Hymenula cerealis Ellis & Everh., (1894)

Synonyms
- Cephalosporium gramineum Nisik. & Ikata, (1934); Phialophora cerealis (Ellis & Everh.) Nirenberg & Dalchow, (1990)

= Cephalosporium gramineum =

Fungal disease of wheat, barley

Cephalosporium gramineum syn. Hymenula cerealis is a plant pathogen that causes cephalosporium stripe of wheat and other grasses. It was first reported in Japan in 1930. The disease can cause yield losses of up to 50% by causing death of tillers and reducing seed production and seed size. The disease causes broad yellow or brown stripes along the length of the leaf and discolouration of the leaf veins. The fungus spreads through the soil, and enters the plant through wounds in its roots. Early planting of winter wheat when the soil is warm gives a greater root system more subject to root breakage when the soil heaves affording more infection sites. Phosphate fertilizer and high moisture further exacerbate this condition. The symptoms are caused by the fungus invading the plants' vascular tissue. The fungus also produces a toxin which causes stunting of the plant and interferes with development. A glucopolysaccharide also appears to inhibit fluid movement in wheat.

Very little natural resistance to the disease is seen in wheat. Control measures include crop rotation for 2–3 years in areas where the disease has become a particular problem. Currently, no options exist for controlling the disease through the use of fungicides.
