= Drechslera campanulata =

Scientific classification
- Domain: Eukaryota
- Kingdom: Fungi
- Division: Ascomycota
- Class: Dothideomycetes
- Order: Pleosporales
- Family: Pleosporaceae
- Genus: Drechslera
- Species: D. campanulata

Binomial name
- Drechslera campanulata (Lév.) B. Sutton, (1976)
- Angiopoma campanulatum Lév., (1841)

Species of fungus

Drechslera campanulata is a plant pathogen.
