= Phaeosphaeria herpotrichoides =

Scientific classification
- Domain: Eukaryota
- Kingdom: Fungi
- Division: Ascomycota
- Class: Dothideomycetes
- Order: Pleosporales
- Family: Phaeosphaeriaceae
- Genus: Phaeosphaeria
- Species: P. herpotrichoides

Binomial name
- Phaeosphaeria herpotrichoides (De Not.) L.Holm (1957)

Synonyms
- Leptosphaeria herpotrichoides De Not. (1863)

Species of fungus

Phaeosphaeria herpotrichoides is a fungal plant pathogen that infects the commercial crops rye and wheat.

It is common in Iceland where it infects a range of host species, including the wood of Betula pubescens, and the leaves of Dactylis glomerata, Deschampsia caespitosa, Kobresia myosuroides, Leymus arenarius, Luzula spicata, Milium effusum, Phleum pratense, Poa alpina, Poa glauca and Poa nemoralis.
