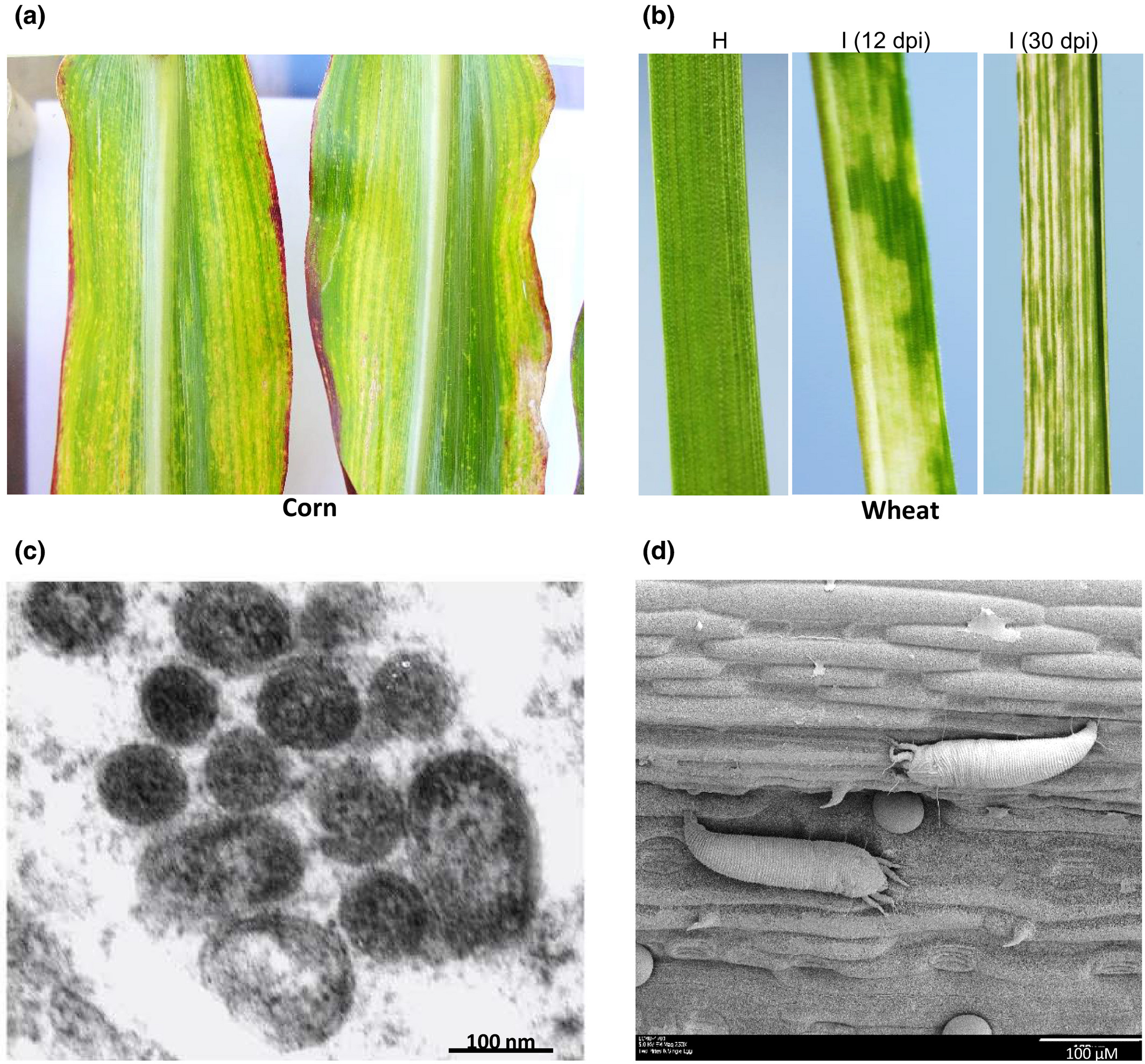
- The symptoms of High Plains wheat mosaic emaravirus on maize and wheat.

Virus classification
- (unranked): Virus
- Realm: Riboviria
- Kingdom: Orthornavirae
- Phylum: Negarnaviricota
- Class: Bunyaviricetes
- Order: Elliovirales
- Family: Fimoviridae
- Genus: Emaravirus
- Species: Emaravirus tritici

Synonyms
- High Plains wheat mosaic emaravirus; High Plains virus; High Plains wheat mosaic virus; Maize red stripe virus

= High Plains wheat mosaic emaravirus =

Emaravirus tritici

Species of virus

High Plains wheat mosaic emaravirus (WMoV), also known as High Plains virus (HPV) or Maize red stripe virus (MRSV/MRStV), is the causative agent of High plains disease of maize and wheat. It is spread by wheat curl mite, Aceria tosichella, which also transmits Wheat streak mosaic virus. The mite's ability to transmit a number of different viruses to cereal crops make it an economically important agricultural pest. In late June 2017 this virus was first detected in Canada, in Alberta. The Alberta samples were 99% similar to those in the USA. As Wheat streak mosaic virus is already present in Alberta, and coinfection with these two causes even more severe damage, this could cause much higher yield losses.

== Genome ==
Researchers at USDA-ARS published the whole genome of HPWMoV. They reported that the eriophyid mite-transmitted Wheat mosaic virus contains eight genomic RNA segments, the most in a known negative-sense RNA plant virus. The RNA-dependent RNA polymerase, glycoprotein precursor, nucleocapsid, and P4 proteins of WMoV exhibited limited sequence homology with the orthologous proteins of other emaraviruses, while proteins encoded by additional genomic RNA segments displayed no significant homology with proteins reported in GenBank, suggesting that the genus Emaravirus evolved further with a divergent octapartite genome. The genome of HPWMoV was shown to encode two suppressors of RNA silencing, to counter antiviral defense of the host wheat plants.
