= Wheat dwarf virus =

Virus classification
- (unranked): Virus
- Realm: Monodnaviria
- Kingdom: Shotokuvirae
- Phylum: Cressdnaviricota
- Class: Repensiviricetes
- Order: Geplafuvirales
- Family: Geminiviridae
- Genus: Mastrevirus
- Species: Mastrevirus hordei

Pathogenic plant virus

Wheat dwarf virus (WDV) is a plant pathogenic virus in the family Geminiviridae. The two isolates of WDV affect wheat and barley. It is spread by the leafhopper Psammotettix alienus.

== Hosts and symptoms ==
There are two main types of strains of WDV, which can be distinguished by their host preference for either wheat (Triticum aestivum) or barley (Hordeum vulgare). WDV can cause a range of symptoms in their host plant that are both localized and systemic. For example, the growth of the plant can be stunted, appearing bush-like. The plant can have fewer tillers (stems produced by grass) and leaves than normally observed. Small parts of the leaf may also be affected by chlorosis, which can eventually take over the entire leaf. The number of spikes on the plant may be reduced or existing ones may be stunted. WDV is transmitted by leafhoppers, which suck phloem sap from the vegetative sections of wheat with their mouthparts, passing on the virus. This is a circulative, non-propagative transmission process.

== Importance ==
About 10,000 years ago, wheat became a domesticated crop in Europe. However, during the domestication process, some traits of wheat which occurred in the wild ancestors were lost. Therefore, diseases including those caused by WDV have been detrimental occurrences in the past century in several European countries. In Sweden, characteristics symptoms for wheat dwarf were detected and seemed to be identical to symptoms of a disease called Slidsjuka, which was found in the early 1900s. Slidsjuka destroyed numerous wheat fields and had not been an issue since the 1940s, until it was recently identified as WDV. Wheat dwarf has led to large crop yields losses of up to 75% on major wheat fields throughout Europe. It has been shown that up to 50% of winter wheat in one field can be infected by WDV during the summer in Sweden. The recent causes of increased prevalence of wheat dwarf have been found to be a result of changing agricultural practices that have been favorable for the disease. An agricultural practice used recently to control the disease has been chemical insecticides, which target the vector in autumn.

Wheat cultivation for farmers in Sweden have been severely threatened by wheat dwarf. As climate change is becoming an increasingly large problem worldwide, the incidence of vector-transmitted viruses like WDV is becoming a more prominent problem.

== Management ==
Management and control of wheat dwarf focuses mainly on targeting the vector, leafhopper Psammotettix alienus. Although there are no biological controls for WDV, there are chemical controls that, when integrated with preventative measures, could have a large impact. Insecticides are one source of chemical control, but they are only to be used when there are a large number of vector insects found within the plant. These insecticides can be used in the fall when winter wheat and barley begin to emerge because primary infection occurs via adults feeding at this time. Spraying of insecticides again in the spring can also be done as adult vectors cause secondary spread of the virus. Another way to control the virus is by treating seeds with imidacloprid. Treating the wheat plant itself with pyrethroid can help to avoid the transmission of the virus.

Preventative measures are also very important to stop the development of WDV. For example, using more resistant varieties, like Banquet, can make the effects of the virus less dramatic. Destroying infected plant material can help stop the proliferation of the leafhopper.
