= Northern cereal mosaic virus =

Virus classification
- (unranked): Virus
- Realm: Riboviria
- Kingdom: Orthornavirae
- Phylum: Negarnaviricota
- Class: Monjiviricetes
- Order: Mononegavirales
- Family: Rhabdoviridae
- Genus: Betacytorhabdovirus
- Species: Betacytorhabdovirus graminae

Synonyms
- Cytorhabdovirus gramineae; Northern cereal mosaic cytorhabdovirus

Species of virus

Northern cereal mosaic virus (NCMV) is a plant pathogenic virus of the family Rhabdoviridae.

Winter wheat Russian mosaic virus is probably a strain of this species.
