= Chloris striate mosaic virus =

Virus classification
- (unranked): Virus
- Realm: Monodnaviria
- Kingdom: Shotokuvirae
- Phylum: Cressdnaviricota
- Class: Repensiviricetes
- Order: Geplafuvirales
- Family: Geminiviridae
- Genus: Mastrevirus
- Species: Mastrevirus chloris

Synonyms
- Australian wheat striate mosaic virus

Species of virus

Chloris striate mosaic virus (CSMV) is a plant pathogenic virus of the family Geminiviridae.
