= Drechslera wirreganensis =

Scientific classification
- Domain: Eukaryota
- Kingdom: Fungi
- Division: Ascomycota
- Class: Dothideomycetes
- Order: Pleosporales
- Family: Pleosporaceae
- Genus: Drechslera
- Species: D. wirreganensis

Binomial name
- Drechslera wirreganensis Wallwork, Lichon & Sivan.,(1992)

Species of fungus

Drechslera wirreganensis is a plant pathogen causing Platyspora Leaf Spot.

== Distribution ==
Argentina, Australia, Canada, Egypt, New Zealand, South Africa, and the United States of America.

== Life cycle ==
D. wirreganensis is a seedborne pathogen.
