= Barley yellow streak mosaic virus =

Virus classification
- Group: Group V ((−)ssRNA)
- Order: Mononegavirales
- Family: Rhabdoviridae
- Genus: Cytorhabdovirus
- Species: Barley yellow streak mosaic virus

Synonyms
- BYSMV

Pathogenic virus

Barley yellow streak mosaic virus (BaYSMV) is a plant pathogenic virus.

== Distribution ==
Robertson & Carroll 1989 & 1991, Skaf et al., 1992, and Robertson & Brumfield 2000 find BaYSMV in Canada and the United States.
