= Stagonospora avenae f.sp. triticae =

Scientific classification
- Kingdom: Fungi
- Division: Ascomycota
- Class: Dothideomycetes
- Order: Pleosporales
- Family: incertae sedis
- Genus: Stagonospora
- Species: Stagonospora avenae

Trinomial name
- Stagonospora avenae f.sp. triticae Bissett (1982)

Synonyms
- Leptosphaeria avenaria f.sp. triticea T.W. Johnson 1947

Fungal plant pathogen

Stagonospora avenae f.sp. triticae is a plant pathogen infecting wheat and barley.
