= Sclerotinia borealis =

Scientific classification
- Kingdom: Fungi
- Division: Ascomycota
- Class: Leotiomycetes
- Order: Helotiales
- Family: Sclerotiniaceae
- Genus: Sclerotinia
- Species: S. borealis

Binomial name
- Sclerotinia borealis Bubák & Vleugel, (1917)

Synonyms
- Myriosclerotinia borealis (Bubák & Vleugel) L.M. Kohn, (1979); Sclerotinia graminearum Elenev ex Solkina, (1939)

Species of fungus

Sclerotinia borealis or snow scald is a psychrophilic necrotrophic plant pathogen with wide host range, including crop plants, such as barley, rye and wheat, and thus causing much economical damage.

== Physiology ==
=== Temperature ===
Minimum growth temperature is below −7 °C (19 °F). Optimal growth range is 10–15 °C (50–59 °F). Maximum growth temperature 20 °C (68 °F), whereupon irregular mycelial growth occurs and oxygen consumption is far above healthy level; does not survive above. Sclerotia germination optimal at four weeks of daily thermal cycles of 25 and 15 °C (77 and 59 °F) followed by 20 and 5 °C (68 and 41 °F). Frost is necessary during life cycle.

== Enzymes ==
Produces polygalacturonase; variant with maximum activity between 40 and 50 °C (104 and 122 °F) and only 30% of max activity at 5 °C (41 °F). Activity preserved at 5 °C (41 °F) beyond two years, but inactivated by overnight at room temperature, or by 30 minutes of 50 °C (122 °F). A crude extract of cultured bran contained a particular low mass molecule which maintained activity at low temperature.

== Antifreeze proteins ==
Necessitated by its lifestyle, S. borealis produces its own antifreeze proteins. One of these is homologous to Atlantic winter flounder type I antifreeze protein. Extracellular presence of its AFPs is not necessary.

== Life cycle ==
Upon the spring snowmelt, wet leaves develop S. borealis growth. Sclerotia and mycelia grow on sheaths, crowns, surfaces, and interiors of leaves. It has dramatically more growth – and damage to its hosts – in growth seasons following winters with greater depth of soil freezing but less snow cover. S. borealis is very soil-frost-dependent.

== Morphology ==
Sclerotia are 7–8 millimetres (35/128–5/16 in) long and 3–4 millimetres (15/128–5/32 in) wide when formed (i.e. before desiccation).

Apothecia cup-shaped pale yellow to pale brown, cup diameter 1–6 millimetres (5/128–15/64 in), stalks 1–20 millimetres (5/128–101/128 in) high.

Mycelia gray.

== Hosts ==
Grasses and trees. Economically significant grasses include winter cereals and forages. Conifer seedlings in the Volga and Ural regions Russia.

== Distribution ==
S. borealis is found in cool temperate areas, frigid zone areas and into the Arctic, including northern Japan, Russia (Siberia, middle course of Volga, Ural, Russian Far East), northern Scandinavia, and North America. Specifically including Arctic areas of Alaska, the Yukon, Greenland, Finnmark county in Norway, Finnish Lapland, Swedish Lapland, Svalbard. It was unexpectedly not found in the similar climate of Iceland. Southernmost limit is Iwate, northern Japan, the Altai Mountains in central Siberia, and possibly the Xinjiang Province of China. Not found in any temperate region which also receives snowfall, except Japan.

== Laboratory culture ==
Lab culture must simulate the freezing cycle of the natural range. Can grow on relatively low water potato dextrose agar if twice the normal PDA concentration, sucrose, KCl, and D-mannitol. Higher mycelial growth and lower optimal mycelial growth temp (to 4 °C (39 °F)) if increased intracellular osmosis. Able to utilize nutrients from partially thawed low-water PDA. Vegetative hyphae do not accumulate sclerotinial proteins when cultured at 5 °C (41 °F) but do at 10 and 25 °C (50 and 77 °F), and mycelial proteins cultured at 4 °C (39 °F) are decreased by switch to incubation at 25 °C (77 °F). These may be the/one of the reasons for irregular growth, progressing to lethality, at these higher temperatures.
