= Frederick Adolph Wolf =

American plant pathologist and mycologist

Frederick Adolph Wolf (June 25, 1885 – November 7, 1975) was an American plant pathologist and mycologist. Wolf was known for his contributions to the understanding of fungal and bacterial diseases of tobacco, which he explored both domestically and globally. His most renowned contributions were his two-volume work "The Fungi" which served as a reference and textbook for fungal morphological and evolutionary studies for several years and his "Tobacco Disease and Decays" book.

== Early life and education ==
Wolf was born in Odell, Nebraska, to August Wolf and Wilhelmina (Kracht) Wolf. The family owned a quarter-section farm in Gage County, Nebraska, near Odell, where Wolf grew up and worked while attending elementary and high school. Wolf taught high school for one year after completing high school to save enough money to enroll in university. Wolf attended college at the University of Nebraska from 1903–1907. Upon completion of his bachelor's degree, he pursued a master's degree and completed it in 1908. Wolf went on to do graduate work at the University of Texas for two years under the advisership of Frederick DeForest Heald. He then obtained a doctorate from Cornell University in Ithaca, New York under the guidance and direction of George F. Atkinson. He completed his Ph.D. in 1911 with a dissertation focused on the development of the perfect state of Diplocarpon rosae Black Spot of Roses fungal causal agent, for which he has given the binomial name. Wolf then joined the Alabama Agricultural Experiment Station in Auburn as a plant pathologist where he worked from 1911 to 1915. It was during this time that Wolf married Wynette Taylor, with whom he would be married for 61 years and have two children, four grandchildren, and two great-grandchildren.

== Research ==
Wolf had several significant contributions to both mycology and plant pathology beginning with the discovery of the binucleate nature of Pleurage anserina (later reclassified as Podospora anserina (Ces.) Niessl) ascospores during his Ph.D., which was later important to the genetics of Podospora and the related Neurospora genus. In 1915, Wolf joined the Agricultural Experiment Station as a plant pathologist at what is now North Carolina State University, in Raleigh, North Carolina. Wolf worked here for ten years except during World War I during which he worked in a bacteriology lab at a hospital in Camp Greene, NC. During this time, he became interested in tobacco and began to study different bacterial pathogens of crops including the causal agent of Granville Wilt, Ralstonia solancearum. After ten years in Raleigh, Wolf moved to Orlando, Florida where he began to work with diseases of citrus at the U.S. Department of Agriculture, Bureau of Plant Industry for two years. In 1927, he returned to North Carolina but this time in the Department of Botany at Duke University where he would remain for 27 years. It was during this time that he reconnected with his interest in tobacco and began to work with downy mildews of tobacco caused by Peronospora tabacina. In the latter part of the 1930s, Wolf assisted the Department of Chemistry at Duke in studies of the chemical makeup of various tobacco types grown under various conditions and of the use of volatile fungicides for the control of tobacco blue mold in the seed bed. During World War II, Wolf, H. J. Humm, and others funded by the War Production Board were successful in obtaining agar from Atlantic coast seaweed species Gracilaria confervoides (L.) Grev which alleviated supply shortages of that material at the time.

During his tenure, Wolf took two sabbatical leaves from Duke University, one from 1933 to 1934 at Harvard, and the second from 1947 to 1948 in Venezuela where he worked with the Ministry of Agriculture in the country to improve tobacco cultivation techniques. His relationship with Venezuela continued even after his sabbatical as he was invited to return a decade later to help with viral and fungal disease management and to evaluate the results of his cultivation recommendations. From 1948 to 1949, during his Venezuelan hiatus, the U.S. Army requested that he study meat molding processes and microbes. After this he went back to South America, this time focused on growing Turkish and aromatic tobacco in Colombia, to which he scientifically succeeded but economically failed due to labor costs. To research his 1962 book on aromatic and oriental tobaccos, he traveled to Greece, the Dodecanese Islands, and Turkey in 1959. He attended the Third Tobacco Congress in Salisbury, Rhodesia, in 1963, but due to deteriorating health, he was compelled to turn down an honorary position in the 1966 Athens Congress. He took advantage of the fact that one of his Duke colleagues had cores from lake sediments in East Africa, examined them for fungus spores that were thousands of years old, and used the findings as the foundation for several papers before expanding the study to include fossil fungi from mine sites in North Carolina.

== Publications ==
Wolf has had a few significant publications throughout his professional career. During his time in Raleigh, NC, a considerable amount of the publications he produced were related to bacterial plant pathogens, including a paper on Bacterium tabacum, a tobacco wildfire organism he described with A.C. Foster. In 1935, he published the first edition of his book, "Tobacco Diseases and Decays", and submitted a second revised edition in 1957. Together with his students K. H. Garren and J. K. Miller, they published the bulletin Fungi of Duke Forest in 1938. During Wolf's time on sabbatical leave in Venezuela, he produced several publications and manuscripts of his work regarding the indigenous tobacco varieties grown there, cultural practices employed for breeding and maintenance, leaf curl disease of tobacco, and notes on Venezuelan fungi, all of which were not intentional products of his time. The years after his teaching retirement in 1954 left him with opportunities to publish more papers regarding spore discharge of discomycetes and with tobacco genetic differences. Perhaps his most notable publication for some time was his two-volume textbook on mycology that began circulating in 1947, "The Fungi," and gained wide acceptance for several years. Although the reference work has become obsolete after some time, a few copies of the works continue to be used globally.

== Legacy ==
Wolf taught courses ranging from mycology to bacteriology to forest pathology – teaching students from several different departments across N.C. State University. Given the range of his curriculum and the variety of students and scheduling conflicts, Wolf was known for his incredibly informal teaching environment. It was often seen that students brought sandwiches to the courses that he held during the lunch hour while he passed around a brewed coffee pot. Under his direction, thirty students obtained graduate degrees in mycology at Duke University – many of whom he stayed connected with within their professional careers. Before he retired from teaching in 1954, he was made a James B. Duke professor. An archive of his full list of work and contributions can be obtained from the Department of Botany, Duke University in Durham, North Carolina.

Wolf's legacy also stands with his role as a charter member of both the American Phytopathological Society, for which he was elected a Fellow in 1968 and the Mycological Society of America. He was also a member of several other professional societies, including the American Association for the Advancement of Science, the Botanical Society of America, the British Mycological Society, the Torrey Botanical Club, and the North Carolina Academy of Science. Wolf also served as the president of the North Carolina Academy of Science. In 1965, James Sanford, the Governor of North Carolina, presented Wolf with the honor of the North Carolina Gold Medal for devoting "a great measure of his scientific talents and gifts" to research. In 1970, Wolf was selected as one of Tobacco International's Men of the Year.

Frederick Adolph Wolf continued in active research up until one year before his death at his home in Durham on November 7, 1975. His name was recently commemorated in the Pezizales genus Wolfina, based on the type species W. aurantiopsis (Ellis) Seaver.1937.
