= Pseudoseptoria donacis =

Scientific classification
- Kingdom: Fungi
- Division: Ascomycota
- Class: Dothideomycetes
- Order: Dothideales
- Family: Saccotheciaceae
- Genus: Pseudoseptoria
- Species: P. donacis

Binomial name
- Pseudoseptoria donacis (Pass.) B. Sutton, (1977)

Synonyms
- Lunospora oxyspora (Penz. & Sacc.) Frandsen, (1943); Selenophoma donacis (Pass.) R. Sprague & Aar.G. Johnson, (1940); Selenophoma oxyspora (Penz. & Sacc.) Lavrov, (1951); Septoria donacis Pass., (1879); Septoria oxyspora Penz. & Sacc., (1884)

Species of fungus

Pseudoseptoria donacis is an ascomycete fungus that is a plant pathogen infecting barley, rye and wheat.
