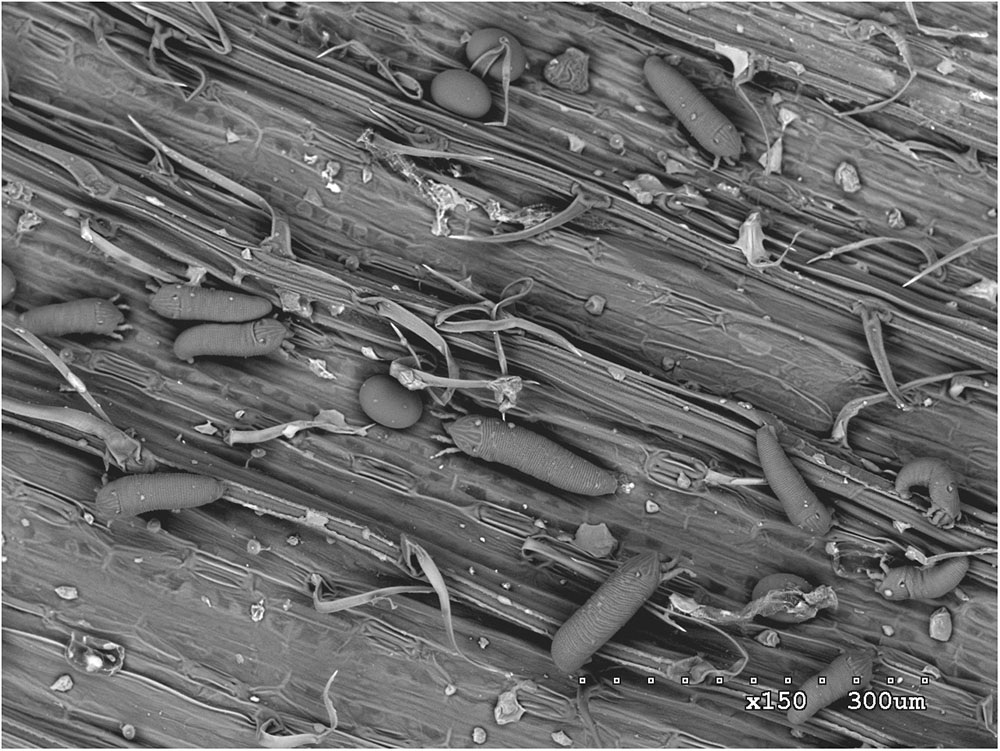
- Electron micrograph of wheat curl mites (Aceria tosichella) on a wheat leaf

Scientific classification
- Kingdom: Animalia
- Phylum: Arthropoda
- Subphylum: Chelicerata
- Class: Arachnida
- Family: Eriophyidae
- Genus: Aceria
- Species: A. tosichella

Binomial name
- Aceria tosichella Keifer, 1969

= Aceria tosichella =

Species of mite

Aceria tosichella, commonly known as the wheat curl mite (WCM), is a global cereal pest and a vector for spreading and transmission of viruses like wheat streak mosaic virus (WSMV) and wheat mosaic virus (WMoV)

== Distribution ==
The distribution of this eriophyid mite is observed mostly in the wheat producing areas of Europe, North and South America.

== Biology ==
When it feeds on wheat, A. tosichella transmits the wheat streak mosaic virus. Infected plants show long yellow streaks, associated with some degree of chlorosis which may lead to death of the affected foliage. In Oklahoma, the disease usually appears in late April and early May when the weather warms up.

== Transcriptome ==
Recently, researchers at USDA-ARS published the whole transcriptome of WCM, and showed that WSMV infection alters gene expression of its vector, wheat curl mite, to enhance mite development and population expansion, to increase transmission.
