= Maize stripe virus =

Virus classification
- (unranked): Virus
- Realm: Riboviria
- Kingdom: Orthornavirae
- Phylum: Negarnaviricota
- Class: Bunyaviricetes
- Order: Hareavirales
- Family: Phenuiviridae
- Genus: Tenuivirus
- Species: Tenuivirus zeae

Synonyms
- Maize chlorotic stripe virus; Maize hoja blanca virus; Sorghum chlorosis virus; Maize stripe tenuivirus

Species of virus

Maize stripe virus (MSpV) is a pathogenic plant virus.
