= Tenuivirus =

Virus classification
- (unranked): Virus
- Realm: Riboviria
- Kingdom: Orthornavirae
- Phylum: Negarnaviricota
- Class: Bunyaviricetes
- Order: Hareavirales
- Family: Phenuiviridae
- Genus: Tenuivirus

Genus of viruses

Tenuivirus is a plant virus genus belonging to Phenuiviridae family in the order Hareavirales. These plant viruses cause diseases in their host plants. Typical symptoms are chlorotic stripes on the affected leaves. This group of viruses make viral inclusions in infected cells which can be used to diagnose infection.

== Virology ==
The virion particle consists of non-enveloped nucleocapsids that exhibit helical symmetry, forming thin, filamentous structures between 500–2100 nm long. The genomes are segmented and consist of four to six strands of negative-sense single-stranded RNA and the N-protein. These viruses are transmitted by an arthropod vectors in the families Cicadellidae or Delphacidae.

Tenuivirus genome is segmented and has an ambisense coding strategy.

== Diseases ==
Maize stripe disease, thought to be caused by Maize stripe virus, is a disease of Maize that is characterized by leaf blight and stunting of the plant. Rice stripe virus and Rice hoja blanca virus has been shown to cause Rice stripe disease and Rice hoja blanca disease respectively, resulting in leaf blight and death of rice plants. Rice grassy stunt disease is caused by Rice grassy stunt virus which results in stunting of rice plants and an excessive tiller.

== Taxonomy ==
Tenuivirus has close phylogenic relationship with members of the genus Tospovirus, the virions of which are bounded with an envelope. Tenuivirus encodes a membrane protein precursor that is homologue to the virion envelope protein of Tospoviridae, although no envelope was found to associate with Tenuivirus virion.

The genus contains the following species, listed by scientific name and followed by the exemplar virus of the species:

- Tenuivirus echinochloae, Echinochloa hoja blanca virus
- Tenuivirus eurotritici, European wheat striate mosaic virus
- Tenuivirus festucae, Festuca stripe-associated virus
- Tenuivirus kwazuluense, Wheat yellows virus
- Tenuivirus oryzabrevis, Rice grassy stunt virus
- Tenuivirus oryzaclavatae, Rice stripe virus
- Tenuivirus oryzalbae, Rice hoja blanca virus
- Tenuivirus persotritici, Iranian wheat stripe virus
- Tenuivirus pontaense, Wheat white spike virus
- Tenuivirus urochloae, Urochloa hoja blanca virus
- Tenuivirus zeae, Maize stripe virus
