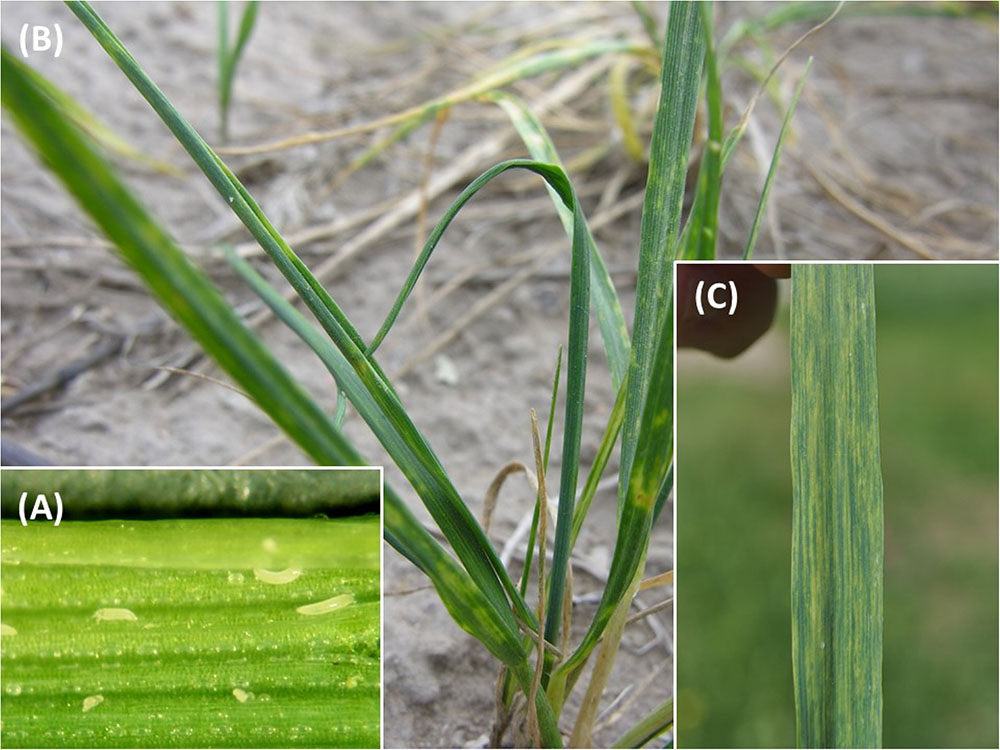
- (A) Wheat curl mite (WCM) on a wheat leaf; (B) leaf curls caused by WCM; and (C) WSMV symptoms on wheat leaf

Virus classification
- (unranked): Virus
- Realm: Riboviria
- Kingdom: Orthornavirae
- Phylum: Pisuviricota
- Class: Stelpaviricetes
- Order: Patatavirales
- Family: Potyviridae
- Genus: Tritimovirus
- Species: Tritimovirus tritici

= Wheat streak mosaic virus =

Species of virus

Wheat streak mosaic virus (WSMV) is a plant pathogenic virus of the family Potyviridae that infects plants in the family Poaceae, especially wheat (Triticum spp.); it is globally distributed and vectored by the wheat curl mite, particularly in regions where wheat is widely grown. First described in Nebraska in 1922, stunted growth and the eponymous “streaks” of yellowed, non-uniform discoloration are characteristic of WSMV infection. As it has been known to cause 100% crop mortality, WSMV is a subject of ongoing scientific research.

== Genome ==
WSMV is a flexible, rod-shaped virus composed of a positive-sense single-strand RNA genome approximately 8.5 to 12 kilobases in length, and can be either mono- or bipartite. The RNA serves as both the genome and viral messenger. The genomic RNA (or its segments) is translated into polyprotein(s) which are transformed by virus-encoded proteases into functional products.

The virions of WSMV encapsidate a single molecule of positive-sense genomic RNA. The genomic RNA has a single open reading frame encoding a large polyprotein that undergoes post-translational cleavage into at least 10 mature proteins. Researchers at USDS-ARS identified that one of these proteins, P1, as a suppressor of RNA silencing. WSMV P1 was shown to bind to dsRNA to suppress host-defensive antiviral defense.

== Transmission ==
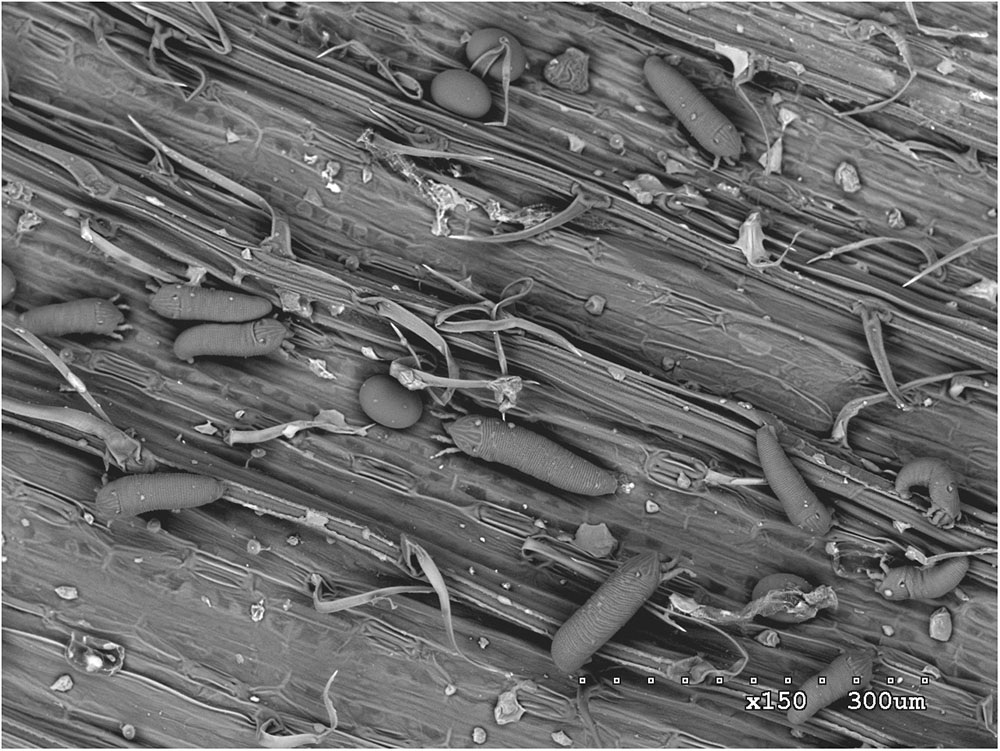
Electron micrograph of wheat curl mites on a wheat leaf

WSMV is semi-persistently transmitted by the wheat curl mite (Aceria tosichella), a small, cigar-shaped arthropod that can produce a single generation within 10 days under optimum temperature- approximately 27 °C. Wheat curl mites are slow crawlers, and depend on wind to disperse to other plants; they can also overwinter in abandoned infected wheat or corn heads. The mites also have the ability to transfer WSMV in between wheat and corn crops, allowing the virus to persist year-round. One of the most important management techniques to controlling WSMV is by eliminating “volunteer”, or seedlings from the previous years’ infected crop, wheat plants. WSMV often overwinters on the seeds, and can spread to a field planted after the infected seedlings have sprouted. Recently, researchers at USDA-ARS showed that WSMV infection alters gene expression of its vector, wheat curl mite, to enhance mite development and population expansion, to increase viral transmission.

== Agricultural importance ==
Depending on the location, WSMV infection has been reported to reduce yield by up to 100%; furthermore, WSMV has been shown to display synergistic interactions with other viruses (specifically Triticum mosaic virus and High plains virus), further exacerbating crop yield problems. WSMV infects some of the most agriculturally important members of the family Poaceae, including wheat, corn, rye, oats, barley, sorghum, and millet; additionally, some grassy weeds have been known to serve as alternate hosts.

== Diagnosis ==
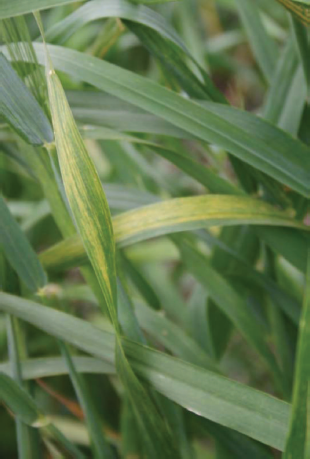
Winter wheat ‘Arapahoe’ showing advanced symptoms with streaks coalescing into almost solid yellow areas because of WSMV infection

“Serious infection of winter wheat occurs in early fall, but symptoms usually do not develop until spring. As spring temperatures rise, symptoms become more visible and rapidly develop when daily high temperatures first exceed about 80°F for several days.”

“Rolled and trapped leaves are good indicators of heavy mite populations, and their presence is useful in determining if stands of volunteer wheat are potential reservoirs of both the virus and the mite.”

“A cool spring will delay the onset of severe symptoms and moderate damage, but an early, warm spring will maximize impact on the plants.”

A second virus that is often found in wheat and associated with wheat streak mosaic is the high plains virus (HPV). The high plains virus usually occurs along with wheat streak mosaic virus on both wheat and corn and is known to be transmitted only by the wheat curl mite. Both viruses can be positively identified by a serological test such as ELISA (Enzyme-Linked Immunosorbent Assay). More recently, plants infected with WSMV are also often found to be simultaneously infected with Triticum mosaic virus, which synergistically interacts with WSMV to exacerbate yield loss.

== Epidemiology ==
WSMV survives year-round in grasses and cereals; its severity depends on weather conditions that favour the winter and summer-growing hosts and the spread from one to the other by the mite vectors. WSMV is the predominant wheat-infecting virus in the American Great Plains region; it is also found in Australia, where it was determined that WSMV most likely has a global spread in most wheat-growing locations due to being seed-borne. The genome of WSMV has been completely sequenced, and current research is investigating plant resistance to WSMV using RNAi technology.

== Management ==
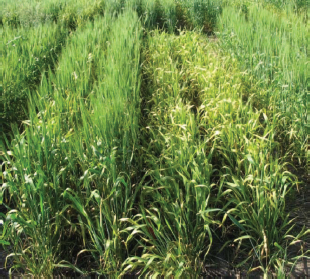
Healthy wheat (L) and stunted WSMV-infected wheat (R)

Practices that have been shown to be effective at controlling WSMV include the following:

- Destruction of volunteer wheat at least 2 weeks prior to planting winter wheat in the fall is the most effective management practice for both the mite and disease.
- Avoiding early planting can reduce wheat curl mite numbers and the length of time that they have to transmit wheat streak.
- Varietal selection; producers in areas where wheat streak is common should avoid varieties that are highly susceptible to WSMV (e.g. the variety RonL is extremely susceptible).
- Avoiding use of miticides, as it has not been shown to be effective.
