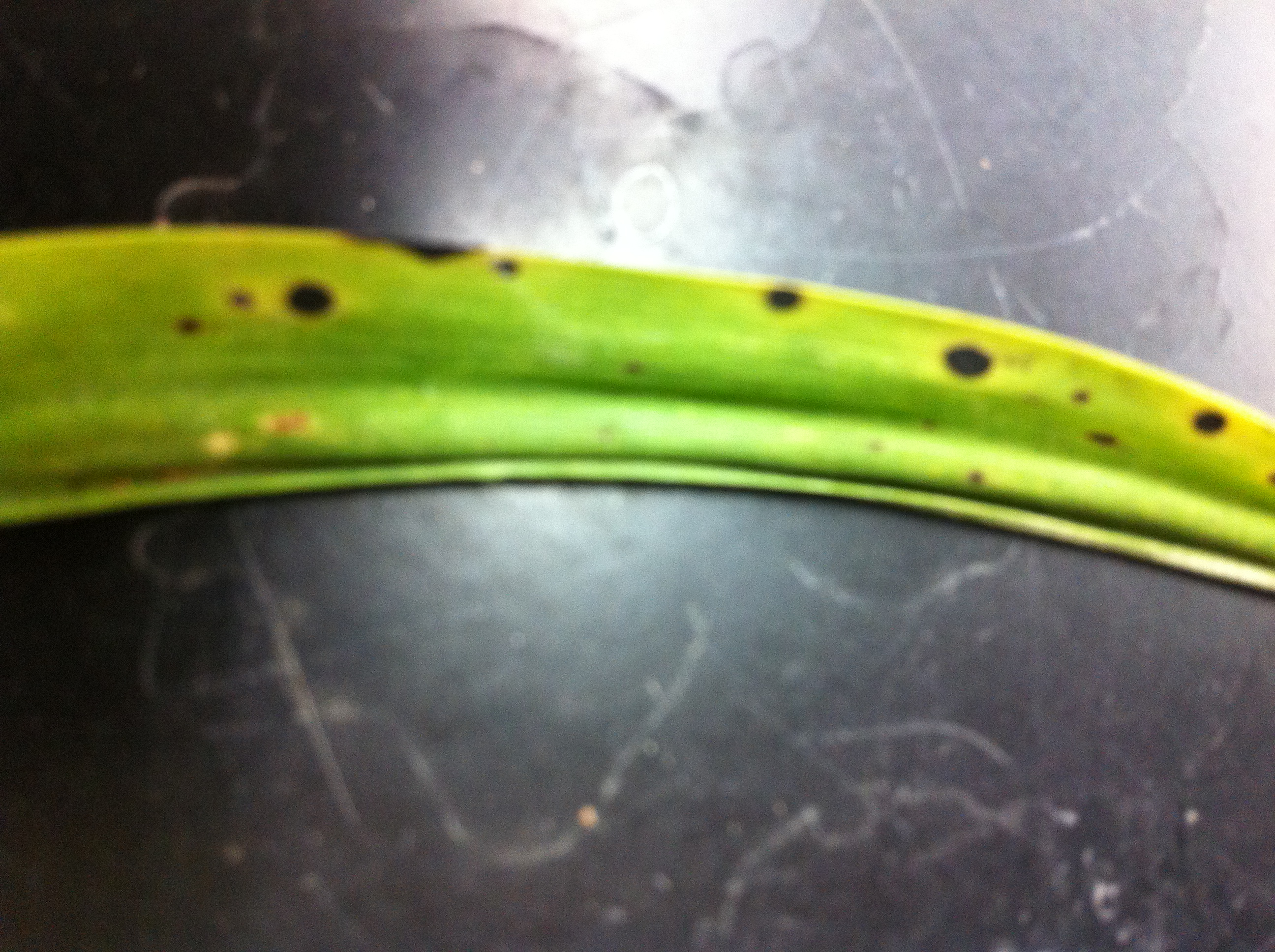
- Orchid leaf infected with CymMV

Virus classification
- (unranked): Virus
- Realm: Riboviria
- Kingdom: Orthornavirae
- Phylum: Kitrinoviricota
- Class: Alsuviricetes
- Order: Tymovirales
- Family: Alphaflexiviridae
- Genus: Potexvirus
- Species: Potexvirus cymbidii

Synonyms
- Orchid mosaic virus; Cymbidium black streak virus

= Cymbidium mosaic virus =

Species of virus

Cymbidium mosaic virus (CymMV) is a plant pathogenic virus of the family Alphaflexiviridae.

Cymbidium mosaic virus and the Odontoglossum ringspot virus (ORSV) are two of the most common viruses affecting cultivated orchids worldwide. Infected plants can have less desirable flowers or other problems, causing significant financial losses to orchid growers. The virus has not often been reported in wild orchid populations. It can be found in a wide variety of orchid genera but does not infect plants other than orchids.

Once an orchid is infected, the virus spreads throughout the infected plant in a number of weeks. Control measures may include sanitizing pruning equipment between plants. There is an ELISA test available to test for presence of the virus.

It is related to the Narcissus mosaic virus (NMV), the Scallion virus X (SVX), the Pepino mosaic virus (PepMV) and the Potato aucuba mosaic virus (PAMV).

== Importance ==
Orchids are composed of nearly 200,000 species of plants with attractive flowers. They are predominantly found in wet climates. The orchid family is one of the most important plant families in respect to the ornamental flower industry. In 2005, the potted orchid industry brought in about $144 million in the United States. This makes them the second most valuable potted plant in the nation. From 1996 to 2006 there has been a 206.4% increase in potted orchid prices. Globally, Taiwan, Taipei, Thailand, the United Kingdom, Italy, Japan, Brazil, and New Zealand are among the largest importers of potted orchids. Additionally, orchids are the source of vanilla. It is the only commercially important derivation from the plants - most commonly found in the Vanilla planifolia species.

The virus stunts the growth of orchids both through size reduction as well as lowering flower yield. CymMV has also been linked to cases of breakage in flower coloration as well as blossom necrosis. This is especially important because this causes the commercial value of the plants to be greatly reduced.

== Signs and symptoms ==
CymMV causes a mosaic of irregularly shaped chlorotic and/or necrotic lesions to appear on infected hosts. Additionally, infected plants will show smaller yields. Sometimes the orchids may display chlorotic rings while others will display symptoms in lesions. Sunken patches can also be observed on leaves. Lastly, certain infected plants may be symptom-less but are still viral enough to infect other neighboring plants. This is because the chlorosis and necrosis can take time to show; however, the virus can still be present on a leaf that does not display such obvious symptoms of the disease. The virus is still able to be transmitted from the plant despite its "healthy" appearance. The virus can be detected with ELISA, immunodiffusion tests, or a nucleic acid hybridization assay.

== Viral cycle ==
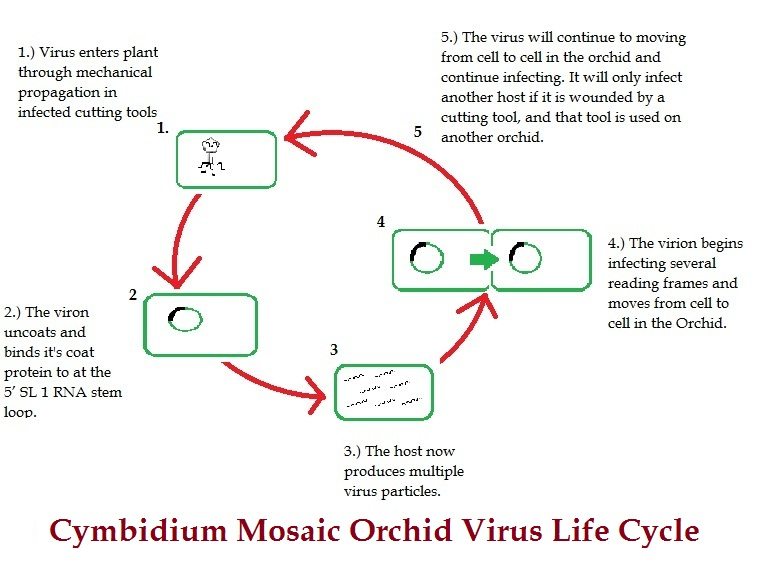

The Cymbidium mosaic virus starts out by infecting the host through a wound on the plant. Generally this wound occurs through plant propagation using contaminated cutting tools. Once inside the orchid, the virion uncoats, binds its coat protein to the host on the 5’ SL 1 RNA stem loop and begins incorporating its RNA into it. This allows for the host cell to begin producing virus particles. The virus then begins infecting reading frames such as TGB1, TGB 2, and TGB 3, each of which aid in the virus's ability to spread from cell-to-cell in the orchid. When the virus infects TGB 1, it allows for the virus to move easily through the plasmodesmata. After the virus infects TGB 2 and TGB 3, it allows for the virus to begin moving through each of the orchid cells' endoplasmic reticulum. Affecting these sites allows for the virus to move easily through each of the plant cells. Overall, the monopartite, positive, sRNA from the virion connects its 3’ tail with that of the host's 5’ RNA. Translations will continue to occur, and disassemble from the 5’ end of the virion. With more of the virions circulating throughout the host, it only takes another wound from a cutting tool to begin infecting another orchid.

== Environment ==
When cultivated in a greenhouse or commercially, the virus is spread mechanically if tools used in cultivation are not properly sanitized. The virus exists systemically within the plant, and persists in sap that can be spread by such methods. In the wild, the virus is most likely spread by insect vectors. A different orchid virus, the orchid fleck virus, may be transmitted by the Brevipalpus mite. There is also evidence that cockroaches are able to transmit CymMV.

== Management ==
There is no way to cure a plant that has the virus. The only thing to do once a plant is infected is to destroy it. The best management solution is to prevent the spread of disease. This is accomplished through effective disinfection of tools used in cultivation, including any plastic containers and razor blades. Autoclaving, flaming, and chemical treatment with trisodium phosphate and bleach solution are traditional methods for disinfection. The use of Streptomyces culture filtrate, which has also been shown to disinfect mad cow disease-causing prions, is another promising disinfectant. This method is shown to be effective in removing the virus from various tools, human nails, and orchid seeds. Another possible management strategy is development of plant resistance. An attempt to transform a mutant CymMV movement protein gene into Dendrobium orchids was slightly successful (9 of 259 plants were resistant and expressed the marker gene); the success of transformations actually conferring resistance appears to be related to a post-transcriptional gene silencing mechanism.
