= Bamboo mosaic virus satellite RNA cis-regulatory element =

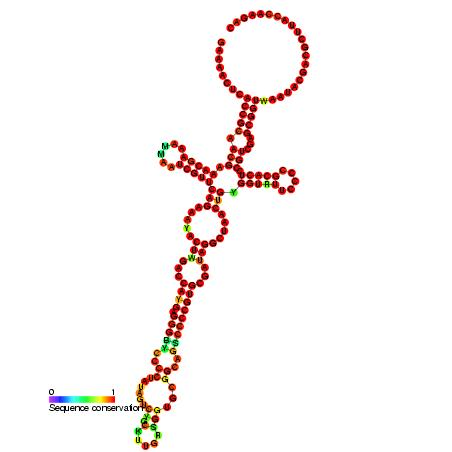
- Predicted secondary structure and sequence conservation of satBaMV_CRE

Identifiers
- Symbol: satBaMV_CRE
- Rfam: RF00389

Other data
- RNA type: Cis-reg
- Domain(s): Viruses
- SO: SO:0000233
- PDB structures: PDBe

The bamboo mosaic virus satellite RNA cis-regulatory element is an RNA element found in the 5' UTR of the genome of the bamboo mosaic virus. This element is thought to be essential for efficient RNA replication.

== See also ==
- Bamboo mosaic potexvirus (BaMV) cis-regulatory element
- Potato virus X cis-acting regulatory element
- Poxvirus AX element late mRNA cis-regulatory element
