= Donkey orchid symptomless virus =

Virus classification
- (unranked): Virus
- Realm: Riboviria
- Kingdom: Orthornavirae
- Phylum: Kitrinoviricota
- Class: Alsuviricetes
- Order: Tymovirales
- Family: Alphaflexiviridae
- Genus: Platypuvirus
- Species: Platypuvirus asinorchis

Species of virus

Donkey orchid symptomless virus (DOSV) was first discovered in Perth, Australia which is located on the Western side of Australia. The Southwest Australian Floristic Region is very biodiverse and secluded with deserts on the east and northeast side along with the ocean on the south side. It is home to approximately 8,000 indigenous plant species that are accustomed to living in a Mediterranean climate. This type of climate means that the plants have adapted to living in unfertile soil, dryness, and can withstand frequent fires in the area. Out of 394 terrestrial orchid species, 76 of these species are threatened. Reasons contributing to plants being threatened in this area could be due to the rate at which they reproduce fruit, pollinate, or human contact.

== Experimental data ==
Throughout the years 2011-2013, three researchers conducted a study on common donkey orchids. The article that was published in 2013 is titled, Donkey Orchid Symptomless Virus: A Viral ‘Platypus’ from Australian Terrestrial Orchids. Through this experiment the researchers were able to perform an entire genome sequence for Donkey orchid symptomless virus. The unusual thing about this virus is that it does not cause visible symptoms of infection on the orchids, hence the name Donkey orchid symptomless virus.

So far, it has only been looked at in the Australian terrestrial orchid Diuris longifolia, commonly named ‘common donkey orchid’ and another terrestrial orchid, Caladenia latifolia (pink fairy orchid). The plants were growing in a leftover patch of forest in Perth. The virus was identified in 3 plants: 2 common donkey orchids (of which 264 plants were tested) and one plant from the group Caladenia latifolia (pink fairy orchid) in which 129 were tested. The donkey orchid has ear-like petals which is where its name originated from.

DOSV most likely evolved in Western Australia because it has so far only been found in orchids endemic to the region, but it is possible that it could have been brought overseas from another region, but researchers are not sure where it came from or how it go to Australia. Therefore, no one knows the vector for Donkey orchid symptomless virus (insect, mammal, etc.).

As of now, DOSV is more uncommon than other plant viruses because it was only found in 2 common donkey orchids out of the 294 that were tested. The uncommonness of this plant virus could be due to the small number of tested plants in this study, the specific area in which the plants were tested from, or that the two orchid species infected by DOSV have not been studied enough. The common donkey orchid is not threatened which could mean a multitude of things, including that the virus itself has a poor method of entry, replication etc. The rarity of the virus could also be due to the inefficient transmission from plant to plant or the unknown vector could be uncommon in that region of Australia.

During the experiment that was conducted in 2011, 2012, and 2013, it was proved that lyophilization (freezing the leaves of the test plants) inactivates the replication of the virus. In the leaves of orchids that were frozen, the virus was not found in the RNA. In the leaves of orchids that were not frozen, DOSV was found in the viral RNA.

In order to assess how DOSV is scattered among wild orchid plants in Western Australia, RT-PCR was used to analyze the RNA taken from the leaves of common donkey orchids and the “two primer pairs that were used were DOSV8F5200 and DOSV8R6100; DOSV10F6800 and DOSV10R7700).” Therefore, researchers were able to observe if the virus was in the RNA of the common donkey orchids that were being tested.

== Viral classification structure ==
Donkey orchid symptomless virus is a positive-sense single-stranded RNA virus. The virus is in the order Tymovirales and the replicase lineage is Potexvirus-like. It is believed that the virion of DOSV is more like a ‘flexuous’ rod shape rather than an icosahedron shape.

The movement proteins of the virus seem to be closely related the Furovirus, which is a virus in the family Virgaviridae. This virus also uses plants as its host and has a bipartite genome, just like DOSV.

== Genome ==
The virus has a bipartite genome which means that the genome is segmented into two parts instead of just one part and the genome is 7.8 kb in size.

The RNA from the plants was previously extracted in order to see if the RNA contains the virus. From here, researchers were able to sequence the genome of the virus. The results from the sequencing concluded that the genome contains “7 open reading frames along with a 5’ untranslated region and a 3’ UTR” (untranslated region). The 5’UTR and the 3’UTR (146-147 nt in length) do not share any identity with any other known virus, so these regions of the genome are specific to DOSV.

Donkey orchid symptomless virus also has a putative coat protein and a movement protein. The movement protein in DOSV helps the virus move from an infected cell to a completely healthy cell. This then allows the virus to infect the healthy cell by entering and taking over the cell’s machinery to perform translation of the viral mRNA along with replication of the viral genome. Once the virus replicates itself in the cell, it can take over the cell and cause cell death.

== Entry into cell ==
There has not been any research conducted on the virus’s entry into plant cells, but since it is closely related to Furovirus, the virus could possibly have a similar way of entry. Furovirus enters its way into a plant cell by penetrating the plasma membrane and then the viral RNA is released into the cytoplasm of the cell. From here on out, the virus uses the cell’s own machinery to carry out transcription and replication.

== Replication and transcription ==
There is not much information on the replication and transcription of Donkey orchid symptomless virus because there has not been much research conducted. However, as mentioned before, DOSV is closely related to Furovirus which carries out transcription and replication by using the plant cell’s own machinery.

The replicase in DOSV shares similar identity with plant viruses of the family, Alphaflexiviridae, which are also (+)ssRNA viruses that use plants as their host. Viruses in the Alphaflexiviridae family enter the plant cells and replicate in the same fashion as the Furovirus.

Another virus that is in Alphaflexiviridae and is very similar to DOSV is the Platypuvirus. This virus replicates similarly to the other mentioned virus (Furovirus) in that it enters the cell by penetrating and the replication occurs by using “viral factories” in the cell.

== Modulation of host processes/interaction with host ==
There has not been much research conducted on the exact interaction with the host or how the host processes are affected. This could be due to the fact that plant viruses are not as heavily studied as animal viruses. However, researchers have found that the virus causes the leaves to become necrotic. The plant itself does not necessarily exhibit visible symptoms on the outside, but it does on the inside.

== Associated disease(s) ==
When the virus replicates in the plant it can cause infection which has led to the following visible symptoms: leaf distortion, mosaic patterns on the leaves, and stunting.

== Tropism ==
Though research has not been conducted on the reaction of the common donkey orchid to DOSV, researchers have noticed that most of the orchids in the Western Australian region seem to be healthy. This could be due to the vector of the virus (which is not known) to be unsuccessful when infecting the orchids, the type of environment the orchids are located in or it could be due to survival of the fittest among the orchid population.
