= Nana Adjoa Sifa Amponsah =

Ghanaian social entrepreneur

- Born: 21 May 1988 (age 37); Ghana
- Occupations: Advocate, Social Entrepreneur, Consultant, Agribusiness Trainer
- Years active: 2015– present
- Known for: Agribusiness, Female Founder Ecosystem Builder
- Title: Founder at Guzakuza

Nana Adjoa Sifa Amponsah (born 1988), is a Ghanaian social entrepreneur and advocate for women's economic empowerment.

Nana is the initiator of Guzakuza, a social enterprise based in Ghana and the UK that focuses on inspiring women in Agribusiness/Agritech across Africa. The organization aims to bridge the gender gap in the agribusiness sector by providing tools and resources such as training, mentorship, and support to women farmers and agripreneurs.

== Education ==
Nana is a certified social entrepreneur from the International Institute of Social Entrepreneurs.

== Career ==
Between 2012 and 2015, Nana served as the President of the Direct Impact Foundation in Ghana, an organization aiming to bridge the gap between rural and urban education. Nana became the co-founder of Yo!Gate Foods, a company that promotes innovative African spicy products in the Ghanaian and Nigerian markets in 2015. From 2020 to 2022, She was a member of the UN Women's Economic Empowerment Reference Group in East and Southern Africa and a jury member for the German Corporation's Game Changers Women in Agriculture Programme, all to inspire, train, and empower women and girls in Africa. Nana serves as director at the London Centre for Agribusiness, a one-stop web platform where New Agribusiness founders learn collaboratively with peers and experts, access finance and market. She is a steering committee member of Transformational Investing in Food Systems initiative and High-Level Advisory Member at Regen10.

== Guzakuza ==
Nana is the founder of Guzakuza, founded in 2015, a Ghana-based organization dedicated to advancing women in agribusiness across Africa. Guzakuza is committed to transforming the narrative and creating a future where women play a central role in shaping the agricultural landscape. Guzakuza is a Swahili word that means grow (plant) to impact. With a mission to shatter barriers and foster gender equity in agribusiness by creating opportunities and equipping women with the necessary tools to start and grow their agribusinesses, Guzakuza has directly impacted over 8,000 women across 31 African countries and the diaspora.

Guzakuza, through its initiatives such as African Women in Agribusiness Fellowship-Ignite, Women in Agribusiness Week, African Women in Agribusiness Awards, MentorHer, Dopal, and SheFarms, provides women with agribusiness training, mentorship, access to finance, and access to the market, enabling them to make income and impact as agribusiness entrepreneurs. Nana sees Guzakuza as an approach to tackle the most pressing problems, calling it 'solution ACT’ which stands for advocacy, cooperatives, and training.

== Activities ==
One of Nana's notable activities is the establishment of the Agribusiness Fellowship-Ignite. The program is specifically designed to equip women in the agriculture value chain with the essential skills and knowledge needed to thrive. Participants of the Ignite Fellowship benefit from expert-led training, access to valuable networks, and practical insights into the industry. In 2023, the 7th cohort of the Ignite Fellowship took place within ten days of physical training, where 105 accomplished women from 15 countries graduated out of the 128 who commenced the program, representing 21 African countries. In addition to Ignite, Nana has initiated several impactful programs, including the Africa Women in Agribusiness Awards, the Women in Agribusiness Week, She Farms, and the Women in Food and Agriculture Industry. Each of these initiatives has shaped the lives of many women in Africa, inspiring them to contribute positively to their communities and fostering a culture of excellence and empowerment.

== Social impact ==
Nana dreams to make farming attractive to the young women. In 2017, Nana promoted youth involvement in agriculture through her Ghanaian incubator, branding the sector as "agribusiness." She called for political support and market access, highlighting the need for greater opportunities for women. Her efforts aligned with initiatives by the German Federal Ministry for Economic Cooperation and Development (BMZ) and the G20 to boost rural economies and attract young people to agriculture. In 2017, Nana was in a group that presented The Berlin Charter: Putting rural development on the G20 agenda at the G20 meeting in Berlin.

In 2023, Nana, through Guzakuza, raised concerns about the gender imbalance in Ghana's Farmers Day awards, noting that only one woman had won the top prize in the past 20 years. She advocated for addressing this disparity with targeted solutions to support women in agribusiness and ensure equal recognition. Her efforts aim to highlight the contributions of women and promote gender equality in agriculture.

== Public speaking and advocacy ==
Nana was invited to speak on the G20 panel with the likes of Muhammad Yunus. She has been speaking on panels such as the EU-AU panel, African Union events, Malabo Montpeilla Panel and continues to advocate for women's rights in agribusiness and sustainable business practices.

== Recognitions ==
- 2018: One of Ghana outstanding women in agriculture.
- 2021: AGRA Women in Agribusiness of the Year Awards.
- 2023: Awarded the prestigious Agribusiness Award by Africa 40 under 40.
- 2023: Nominated in Forty under 40 Africa.
- 2023: UK Inspiring Women Awards.
