= HVX =

HVX may refer to:

- Hexagon Vector eXtensions (HVX), Digital Signal Processor (DSP) extensions for Qualcomm Hexagon DSP
- Hosta virus X, a contagious disease affecting hosta plants
- Panasonic AG-HVX200, a digital video camera
