= Lettuce virus X =

Virus classification
- (unranked): Virus
- Realm: Riboviria
- Kingdom: Orthornavirae
- Phylum: Kitrinoviricota
- Class: Alsuviricetes
- Order: Tymovirales
- Family: Alphaflexiviridae
- Genus: Potexvirus
- Species: Potexvirus ecslactucae

Species of virus

Lettuce virus X (LeVX) is a plant virus that has been found infecting lettuce in the Tehran province of Iran. Infection is not known to cause symptoms.
