= Zygocactus virus X =

Virus classification
- (unranked): Virus
- Realm: Riboviria
- Kingdom: Orthornavirae
- Phylum: Kitrinoviricota
- Class: Alsuviricetes
- Order: Tymovirales
- Family: Alphaflexiviridae
- Genus: Potexvirus
- Species: Potexvirus eczygocacti

Species of virus

Zygocactus virus X is a little-understood plant virus which was first reported in a Thanksgiving Cactus (S. truncata) from Missoula, Montana, United States. Transmission takes place through mechanical inoculation. Once infected, the cactus develops symptoms which can include (varying with the host infected) reddening of the pads, mosaics, mottles, ringspots or necrosis. The virus has few known family hosts (under 3) and the exact spread of this virus is unknown, but known to be based in the United States.
