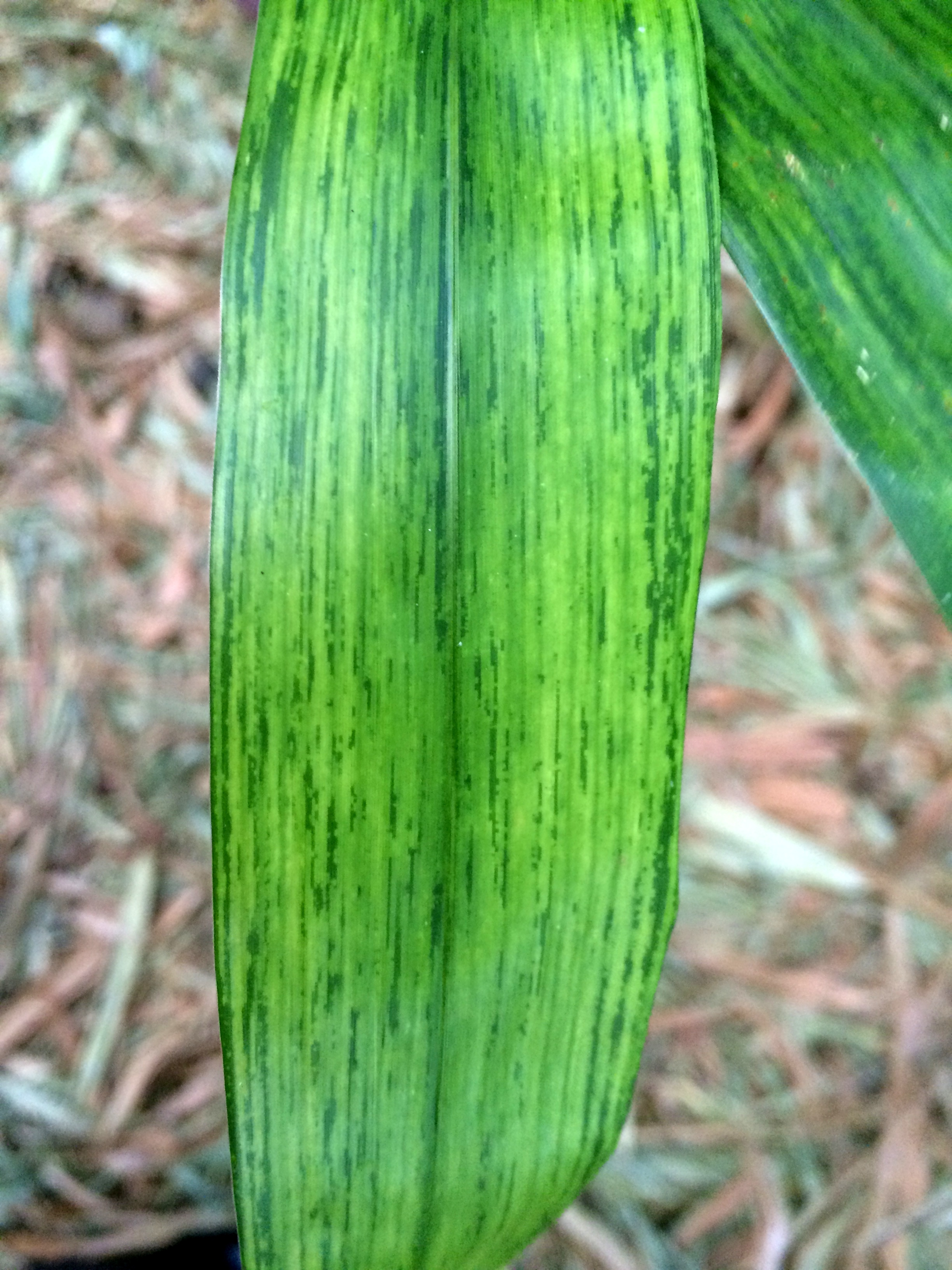

Virus classification
- (unranked): Virus
- Realm: Riboviria
- Kingdom: Orthornavirae
- Phylum: Kitrinoviricota
- Class: Alsuviricetes
- Order: Tymovirales
- Family: Alphaflexiviridae
- Genus: Potexvirus
- Species: Potexvirus bambusae

= Bamboo mosaic virus =

Species of virus

Bamboo mosaic virus (BaMV) is a plant pathogenic virus in the genus Potexvirus and the family Alphaflexiviridae. BaMV is a filamentous, flexuous rod, 490 nm in length and 15 nm in width. The virus has been fully sequenced and it is 6366 nucleotides long.

Like other members of the genus Potexvirus, BaMV is a monopartite strand of positive-sense, single-stranded RNA surrounded by a capsid made for a single viral encoded protein. No insect vector is known. However, it is easily mechanically transmitted on contaminated tools used for propagation or harvesting.

== Distribution ==
It was first isolated in 1974 from two species of bamboo (Bambusa multiples and B. vulgaris) in Brazil. In 1991 it was reported in two other bamboo species (B. oldhammi and Dendrocalamus latiflorus) in Taiwan. Bamboo plants infected with this virus have been found in other Pacific Islands like Hawaii and the Philippines. It has also been found in bamboo plants in Australia.

It was reported in the United States (San Diego Zoo, California) in 1995 but had been tentatively diagnosed in a sample of Bambusa in Florida as early as 1988. Bamboo enthusiasts in Florida had observed virus-like symptoms in their collections for many years before that.

== Symptoms and host range ==
The natural host of this virus is bamboo. It is known to infect at least 12 different species in 7 different genera. In host range studies it has been shown to cause local lesions on Chenopodium amaraticolor and Gomphrena globosa and a systemic infection in barley (Hordeum vulgare), another member of the grass family, Poaceae or Gramineae.

Symptoms in bamboo include chlorotic mottling/mosaic patterns on the leaves which run parallel with the veins (Typical symptoms on leaves), necrotic streaking on the shoots and stem abortion. However, not all susceptible plants show recognizable symptoms.

== See also ==
- Bamboo mosaic potexvirus (BaMV) cis-regulatory element
- Bamboo mosaic virus satellite RNA cis-regulatory element
