= Cactus virus X =

Virus classification
- (unranked): Virus
- Realm: Riboviria
- Kingdom: Orthornavirae
- Phylum: Kitrinoviricota
- Class: Alsuviricetes
- Order: Tymovirales
- Family: Alphaflexiviridae
- Genus: Potexvirus
- Species: Potexvirus ecscacti

Synonyms
- Barrel cactus virus

Species of virus

Cactus virus X (CVX) is a plant pathogenic virus of the family Alphaflexiviridae.
