= Papaya mosaic virus =

Virus classification
- (unranked): Virus
- Realm: Riboviria
- Kingdom: Orthornavirae
- Phylum: Kitrinoviricota
- Class: Alsuviricetes
- Order: Tymovirales
- Family: Alphaflexiviridae
- Genus: Potexvirus
- Species: Potexvirus papayae

Synonyms
- Papaya mosaic potexvirus; Babaco yellow mosaic virus; Boussingaultia mosaic virus; Papaw mild mosaic virus

Species of virus

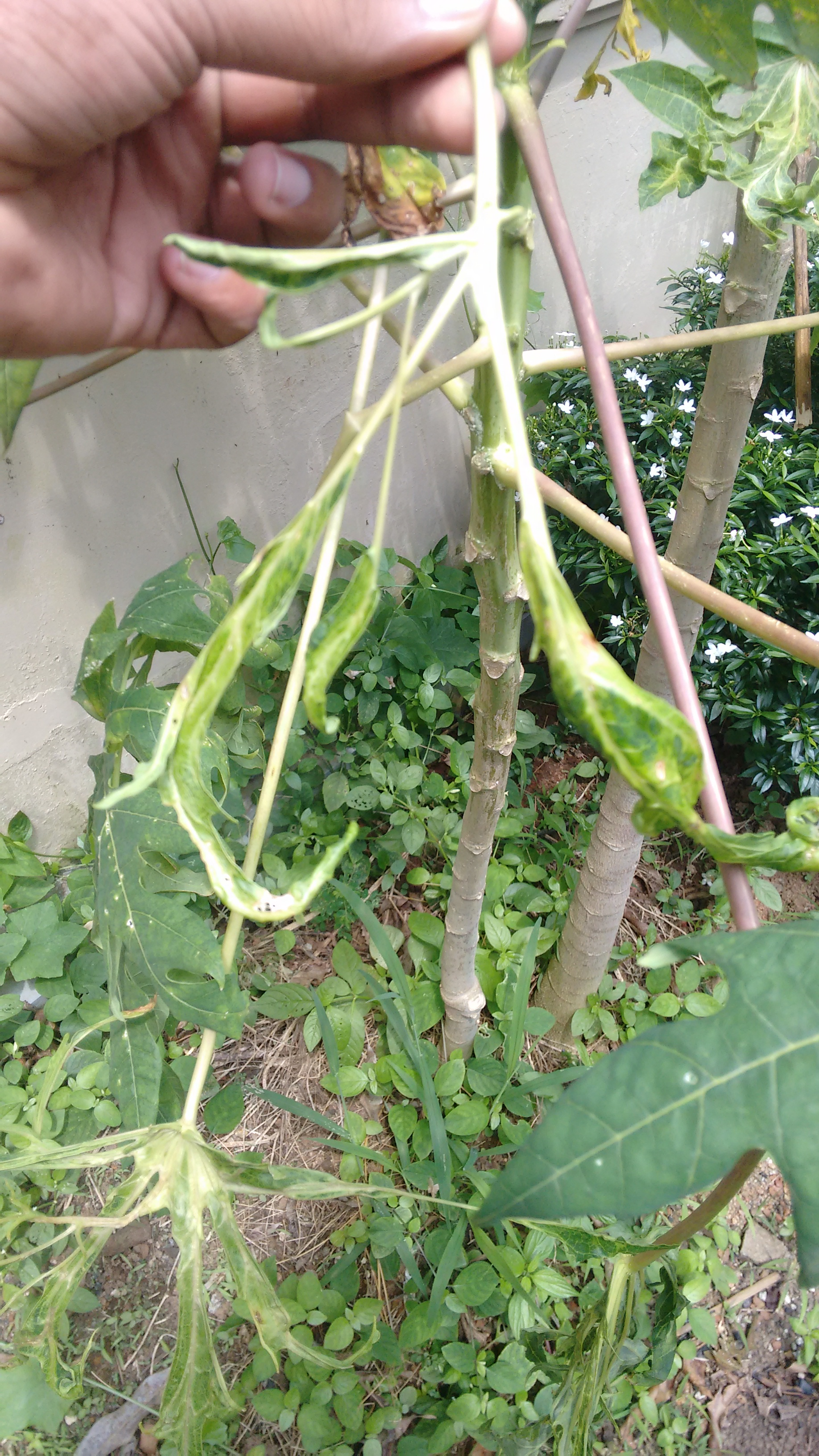
Papaya mosaic virus infected plant

Papaya mosaic virus (PapMV) is a plant pathogenic virus in the genus Potexvirus and the family Alphaflexiviridae. PapMV is a filamentous, flexuous rod, 530 nm in length.

The virus is a monopartite strand of positive-sense, single-stranded RNA surrounded by a capsid made for a single viral encoded protein. The genome has been completely sequenced and is 6656 nucleotides long. It is transmitted by mechanical inoculation. No insect vector is involved and it is not transmitted in seeds.

Mature virions form banded inclusions that can be seen in leaf strips of infected plants when stained with either the Orange-Green protein stain or the Azure A nucleic acid stain.

== Hosts, symptoms and distribution ==
Its principal host is papaya (Carica papaya), although in host range studies, PapMV was able to infect a few other plants including snapdragons (Antirrhinum majus). It is also reported to naturally infect Ullucus tuberosus.

PapMV was first reported in papaya in 1962 together with another virus that became known as Papaya ringspot virus (PRSV), a potyvirus. The two viruses were differentiated in 1965 and 1967 using particle lengths, serology, host range, inclusions, and aphid transmissibility.

PapMV causes mild mosaic symptoms on papaya leaves and stunting of the plant. It is known to occur in South America (Bolivia, Peru, and Venezuela) and the USA.

== See also ==
- Alternanthera mosaic virus
