= Alternanthera mosaic virus =

Virus classification
- (unranked): Virus
- Realm: Riboviria
- Kingdom: Orthornavirae
- Phylum: Kitrinoviricota
- Class: Alsuviricetes
- Order: Tymovirales
- Family: Alphaflexiviridae
- Genus: Potexvirus
- Species: Potexvirus alternantherae

Species of virus

Alternanthera mosaic virus (AltMV) is a plant pathogenic virus. AltMV belongs to the virus genus Potexvirus and the virus family Alphaflexiviridae.

AltMV was first identified in 1999 in Queensland, Australia. The virus was found in Alternanthera pugens (Amaranthaceae), a weed found in both the southern USA and Australia. Since then, AltMV has been identified in various ornamental plants in Italy, the United States (Maryland and Pennsylvania, Florida, and New York), and Brazil.

This virus has a close serological relationship (ELISA/antiserum to the capsid protein) with another well known Potexvirus called Papaya mosaic virus (PapMV). This relationship has led to several examples of misdiagnosis in the past. Sequencing has shown that the core region of the capsid protein is only 79.8% identical to PapMV at the nucleotide level. Isolates of AltMV have shown a 93-99% nucleotide identity to the original Australian isolate.

== Host range and symptoms ==
This virus had been diagnosed in several ornamental plants since its discovery in 1999. These include moss rose (Portulaca grandiflora), phlox (Phlox stolonifera), skullcap (Scutellaria sp), firecracker plant (Crossandra infundibuliformis), angelonia (Angelonia angustifolia), Torenia sp, Helichrysum sp., and Salvia splendens. Three of these (Angelonia, Salvia and Torenia sp) showed no obvious symptoms.

Host range studies showed this virus can also systemically infect tomatoes (Lycopersicon esculentum), faba beans (Vicia faba), sunflowers (Helianthus annuus), and Zinnias (Zinnia elegans). Some cultivars of watermelon (Citrullus lanatus), cucumbers (Cucumis sativus), and black-eyed peas (Vigna unguiculata) also became systemically infected. Many of these plants showed mild symptoms or were asymptomatic. The virus does not seem to infect papaya (Carica papaya).

== Transmission ==
Like other members of the potexvirus genus, this virus is not known to have a specific insect vector. These viruses occur in high concentration in their hosts and are transmitted easily by mechanical means (tools, leaf contact etc.). International trade of ornamental plants propagated by infected cuttings can and probably has spread the disease worldwide.
