= Mandarivirus =

Virus classification
- (unranked): Virus
- Realm: Riboviria
- Kingdom: Orthornavirae
- Phylum: Kitrinoviricota
- Class: Alsuviricetes
- Order: Tymovirales
- Family: Alphaflexiviridae
- Genus: Potexvirus
- Subgenus: Mandarivirus

Subgenus of viruses

Mandarivirus is a subgenus of viruses in the order Tymovirales, family Alphaflexiviridae, genus Potexvirus. There are three species in this subgenus. Diseases associated with this subgenus commonly include yellow ringspot and rapid decline of the tree.

== Taxonomy ==
The following species are assigned to the subgenus, listed by scientific name and followed by their common names:

- Potexvirus citriflavimaculae, Citrus yellow mottle-associated virus
- Potexvirus citriflavivenae, Citrus yellow vein clearing virus
- Potexvirus citrindicum, Indian citrus ringspot virus

== Structure ==
Viruses in Mandarivirus are non-enveloped, with flexuous and filamentous geometries. The diameter is around 13 nm. Genomes are linear, around 7.5kb in length. The genome codes for 6 proteins.

Subgenus	Structure	Symmetry	Capsid	Genomic arrangement	Genomic segmentation
Mandarivirus	Filamentous		Non-enveloped	Linear	Monopartite

== Life cycle ==
Viral replication is cytoplasmic. Entry into the host cell is achieved by penetration into the host cell. Replication follows the positive stranded RNA virus replication model. Positive stranded RNA virus transcription is the method of transcription. The virus exits the host cell by tripartite non-tubule guided viral movement. Citrus trees serve as the natural host with grafting being a common transmission route.

Subgenus	Host details	Tissue tropism	Entry details	Release details	Replication site	Assembly site	Transmission
Mandarivirus	Plants	None	Viral movement; mechanical inoculation	Viral movement	Cytoplasm	Cytoplasm	Unknown
