= Pink fairy =

Pink fairy can refer to one of the following:

- Absinthe colored pink by rose or hibiscus flowers (in contrast with Green Fairy).
- Pink fairy armadillo
- The plant Caladenia latifolia
- The rock band Pink Fairies
