= NMV =

NMV may refer to:

- National Museum Victoria (code NMV)
- New Millenium Version
- Nutan Marathi Vidyalaya
- Netherlands Malacological Society
- Narcissus mosaic virus plant pathogenic virus in the genus Potexvirus and family Alphaflexiviridae, which infects Narcissus
