= SVX =

SVX or svx may refer to:

== Vehicles ==
- Subaru Alcyone SVX, two-door grand tourer coupé automobile
- Defender SVX, model of special edition Land Rover Defender

== Other uses ==
- Koltsovo Airport (IATA code), airport in Yekaterinburg, Russia
- SVX (potexvirus), potexvirus affecting Chinese scallion
- Skalvian language (ISO 639-3 code), a Baltic language

== See also ==
- 8SVX, audio file format standard developed by Electronic Arts for the Commodore-Amiga computer series
