= White clover mosaic virus =

Virus classification
- (unranked): Virus
- Realm: Riboviria
- Kingdom: Orthornavirae
- Phylum: Kitrinoviricota
- Class: Alsuviricetes
- Order: Tymovirales
- Family: Alphaflexiviridae
- Genus: Potexvirus
- Species: Potexvirus trifolii

Synonyms
- Clover mosaic virus; Pea wilt virus

Species of virus

White clover mosaic virus (WClMV) is a plant pathogenic virus in the genus Potexvirus and the family Alphaflexiviridae. WClMV is a filamentous, flexuous rod, 480 nm in length and 13 nm wide.

The virus is a monopartite strand of positive-sense, single-stranded RNA surrounded by a capsid made from a single viral encoded protein. The genome has been completely sequenced and is 5845 nucleotides long. It is transmitted by mechanical inoculation, contact between plants and sometimes by seed (6% in Trifolium pratense). No insect vector is known.

== Host range and geographic distribution ==
Its major host is clover (Trifolium spp). It was first reported in Trifolium repens in 1935. In the western United States and south western Canada it had been found in clover in a mixed infection with another potexvirus, Clover yellow mosaic virus. It is also known to infect peas (Pisum sativum), faba beans (Vicia faba), green beans (Phaseolus vulgaris), cowpea (Vigna unguiculata), cucumbers (Cucumis sativus), squash ( Cucurbita pepo ), and tomatoes (Lycopersicon esculentum).

This virus is believed to be distributed in temperate regions worldwide.

== Diagnosis ==
Potexviruses make banded inclusions made up of layers of parallel virus particles. These inclusions can be seen in the light microscope in leaf strips of infected plant tissue stained with Azure A or Orange-Green stains. The banded inclusions produced by WClMV are disrupted by the process of staining for inclusions. Those of ClYMV are not and thus inclusions can be used to distinguish these two potexviruses. Antiserum and sequence data are also available for the diagnosis of this virus.
