= Plantain virus X =

Virus classification
- (unranked): Virus
- Realm: Riboviria
- Kingdom: Orthornavirae
- Phylum: Kitrinoviricota
- Class: Alsuviricetes
- Order: Tymovirales
- Family: Alphaflexiviridae
- Genus: Potexvirus
- Species: Potexvirus ecsplantagonis

Synonyms
- Actinidia virus X

Species of virus

Plantain virus X is a species of virus, part of the Potexvirus viral genus. It infects the weed plaintain (Plantago lanceolata). DNA sequencing has shown it to be synonymous with Actinidia virus X, infecting kiwifruit (Actinidia spp.) and blackcurrants (Ribes nigrum). The same research also found Plantain virus X infecting Capsicum annuum (sweet pepper) and the ornamental flower Browallia americana.
