= Clover yellow mosaic virus =

Virus classification
- (unranked): Virus
- Realm: Riboviria
- Kingdom: Orthornavirae
- Phylum: Kitrinoviricota
- Class: Alsuviricetes
- Order: Tymovirales
- Family: Alphaflexiviridae
- Genus: Potexvirus
- Species: Potexvirus flavitrifolii

Synonyms
- Pea mottle virus

Species of virus

Clover yellow mosaic virus (ClYMV) is a plant pathogenic virus in the genus Potexvirus and the virus family Alphaflexiviridae. Its flexuous rod-shaped particles measure about 539 nm in length.

Like other members of the Potexvirus genus, ClYMV is a monopartite strand of positive-sense, single-stranded RNA surrounded by a capsid made for a single viral encoded protein. The genome has been completely sequenced and is 7015 nucleotides long. No insect vector is known. This virus is transmitted by mechanical inoculation, sometime by seeds and by dodder (Cuscuta campestris).

Potexviruses make banned inclusions made up of layers of parallel virus particles. These inclusions can be seen in the light microscope in leaf strips of infected plant tissue stained with Azure A or Orange-Green stains. For many potexviruses these inclusions can be disrupted during the staining procedures. The banded inclusions of ClYMV (Fig.1) however, remain stable and therefore can be diagnostic. Antiserum is available for this virus and, as mentioned above, so is sequence data.

Figure 1. Banned inclusions body (I) of Clover yellow mosaic virus in Vicia faba cells, stained with Azure A.(N = nucleus)

== Host range and geographic distribution ==
The major host of ClYMV is clover (Trifolium spp). It was first reported in white clover (Trifolium repens) as early as 1939. However, in 1942 the virus in white clover, then called Trifolium virus 1 or white-clover mosaic was found to be two different viruses when one proved to be transmitted by dodder and did not infect cowpea (Vigna sinensis). The one that systemically infected cowpea became known first as pea wilt virus and then as White clover mosaic virus (WClMV). The one that was transmitted by dodder became known as pea mottle virus and eventually Clover yellow mosaic virus.

ClYMV is now known to infect several other species of clover, peas (Pisum sativum), faba beans (Vicia faba), green beans (Phaseolus vulgaris), cucumbers (Cucumis sativus) and snapdragons (Antirrhinum majus). ClYMV can infect cowpea but it does not spread as fast as WClMV or at all beyond the inoculated leaves.(7)

Until the year 2004, ClYMV was found only in north western regions of the United States and south western regions of Canada. In 2004 it was reported in the eastern United States (Florida) for what is believed to be the first time. It was found in a new host, the ornamental plant, Verbena canadensis variety ‘homestead purple’. In 2005, it was reported in England in another verbena variety. Verbena varieties are propagated by cuttings.
