= Sclerodarnavirus =

Virus classification
- (unranked): Virus
- Realm: Riboviria
- Kingdom: Orthornavirae
- Phylum: Kitrinoviricota
- Class: Alsuviricetes
- Order: Tymovirales
- Family: Alphaflexiviridae
- Genus: Sclerodarnavirus

Genus of viruses

Sclerodarnavirus is a genus of viruses in the order Tymovirales, in the family Alphaflexiviridae. Fungi serve as natural hosts. There is only one species in this genus: Sclerotinia sclerotiorum debilitation-associated RNA virus (Sclerodarnavirus sclerotiniae). Diseases associated with this genus include: hypovirulence or debilitation.

== Structure ==
Genomes are linear, around 5.5kb in length.

Genus	Structure	Symmetry	Capsid	Genomic arrangement	Genomic segmentation
Sclerodarnavirus	Capsid-less		Non-enveloped	Linear	Monopartite

== Life cycle ==
Viral replication is cytoplasmic. Entry into the host cell is achieved by penetration into the host cell. Replication follows the positive stranded RNA virus replication model. Positive stranded RNA virus transcription is the method of transcription. The virus exits the host cell by tripartite non-tubule guided viral movement. Fungi serve as the natural host.

Genus	Host details	Tissue tropism	Entry details	Release details	Replication site	Assembly site	Transmission
Sclerodarnavirus	Fungi	None	Viral movement; mechanical inoculation	Viral movement	Cytoplasm	Cytoplasm	Unknown
