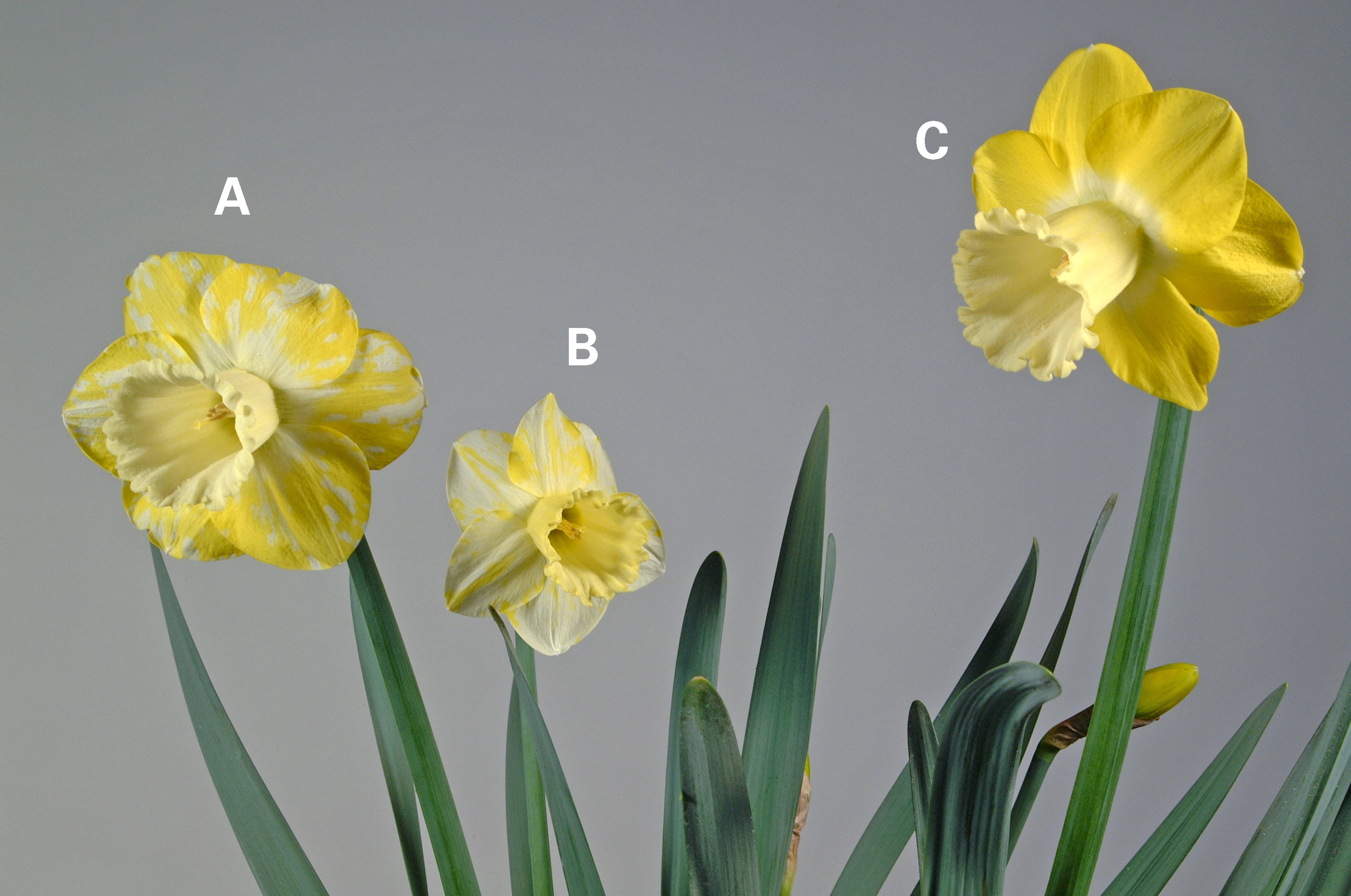
- Color break symptoms caused by narcissus mosaic virus (NMV) in daffodils (A, B) and normal flower (C)

Virus classification
- (unranked): Virus
- Realm: Riboviria
- Kingdom: Orthornavirae
- Phylum: Kitrinoviricota
- Class: Alsuviricetes
- Order: Tymovirales
- Family: Alphaflexiviridae
- Genus: Potexvirus

= Potexvirus =

Genus of viruses

Potexvirus is a genus of pathogenic viruses in the order Tymovirales, in the family Alphaflexiviridae. Plants serve as natural hosts. There are 52 species in this genus, three of which are assigned to a subgenus. Diseases associated with this genus include: mosaic and ringspot symptoms. The genus name comes from POTato virus X).

== Taxonomy ==
Potexvirus contains one subgenus that has three species and 49 additional species unassigned to a subgenus. The following 52 species are assigned to the genus, listed by scientific name and followed by their common names:

- Subgenus: Mandarivirus
  - Potexvirus citriflavimaculae, Citrus yellow mottle-associated virus
  - Potexvirus citriflavivenae, Citrus yellow vein clearing virus
  - Potexvirus citrindicum, Indian citrus ringspot virus

The following species are unassigned to a subgenus:

- Potexvirus alternantherae, Alternanthera mosaic virus
- Potexvirus babaci, Babaco mosaic virus
- Potexvirus bambusae, Bamboo mosaic virus
- Potexvirus chaenostomae, Chaenostoma potexvirus
- Potexvirus colombiense, Cassava Colombian symptomless virus
- Potexvirus cymbidii, Cymbidium mosaic virus
- Potexvirus ecsadenii, Adenium obesum virus X
- Potexvirus ecsallii, Allium virus X
- Potexvirus ecsalstroemeriae, Alstroemeria virus X
- Potexvirus ecscacti, Cactus virus X
- Potexvirus ecscaricae, Papaya virus X
- Potexvirus ecschlumbergerae, Schlumbergera virus X
- Potexvirus ecscnidii, Cnidium virus X
- Potexvirus ecsdioscoreae, Yam virus X
- Potexvirus ecshibisci, Hibiscus virus X
- Potexvirus ecshostae, Hosta virus X
- Potexvirus ecslactucae, Lettuce virus X
- Potexvirus ecslilii, Lily virus X
- Potexvirus ecsmanihotis, Cassava virus X
- Potexvirus ecsmenthae, Mint virus X
- Potexvirus ecsnerinis, Nerine virus X
- Potexvirus ecsopuntiae, Opuntia virus X
- Potexvirus ecsphaii, Phaius virus X
- Potexvirus ecspitayae, Pitaya virus X
- Potexvirus ecsplantagonis, Plantain virus X
- Potexvirus ecspotati, Potato virus X
- Potexvirus ecsthalassiae, Turtle grass virus X
- Potexvirus ecstulipae, Tulip virus X
- Potexvirus ecsvanillae, Vanilla virus X
- Potexvirus eczygocacti, Zygocactus virus X
- Potexvirus flavimaculae, Euonymus yellow mottle associated virus
- Potexvirus flavitrifolii, Clover yellow mosaic virus
- Potexvirus flavivenae, Euonymus yellow vein virus
- Potexvirus fragariae, Strawberry mild yellow edge virus
- Potexvirus hydrangeae, Hydrangea ringspot virus
- Potexvirus lagenariae, Lagenaria mild mosaic virus
- Potexvirus malvae, Malva mosaic virus
- Potexvirus marmoraucuba, Potato aucuba mosaic virus
- Potexvirus marmordioscoreae, Tamus red mosaic virus
- Potexvirus marmormanihotis, Cassava common mosaic virus
- Potexvirus marmorplantagonis, Plantago asiatica mosaic virus
- Potexvirus marmorsennae, Senna mosaic virus
- Potexvirus narcissi, Narcissus mosaic virus
- Potexvirus nesignambrosiae, Ambrosia asymptomatic virus 1
- Potexvirus papayae, Papaya mosaic virus
- Potexvirus pepini, Pepino mosaic virus
- Potexvirus setariae, Foxtail mosaic virus
- Potexvirus triasparagi, Asparagus virus 3
- Potexvirus trifolii, White clover mosaic virus

== Virology ==
The virion length may vary considerably (between 470 and 1000 nanometers or more) and is 12–13 nm in diameter. The pitch of the helix is of the basic helix 3.3–3.7 nm (8–9 copies of the coat protein per turn). It is non-enveloped, flexuous and filamentous. The coat itself is composed of 1000–1500 copies of the coat protein.

The genome is linear, 5.9–7 kilobases in length with a capped 5' end and a polyadenylated 3' end. The genome encodes 5 proteins. From left to right these proteins are: the viral replication protein that consists of a capping enzyme domain, a helicase-like domain, the RNA dependent RNA polymerase, three proteins—the triple gene block (TGB) 1, 2 and 3—and the coat protein.

Genus	Structure	Symmetry	Capsid	Genomic arrangement	Genomic segmentation
Potexvirus	Filamentous		Non-enveloped	Linear	Monopartite

The RNA is translated giving rise to the viral RNA polymerase. This in turn produces a negative stranded template from which a series of subgenomic RNAs are generated. These subgenomic RNAs are then translated into the viral proteins.

The 5' end is about 80 nucleotides in length and typically begins with the sequence GAAAA.

In addition to its RNA polymerase activity, the viral RNA polymerase (molecular weight ~150 kilodaltons) also has methyltransferase and RNA helicase activities.

The TGB proteins are conserved among the Allexivirus, Carlavirus, Foveavirus, Furovirus, Hordeivirus, Pecluvirus, Pomovirus and Potexvirus genera. Their functions are a matter of active research.

TGB 1 (molecular weight 23 kDa) is a multifunctional protein. It has RNA helicase activity and seems to be involved in cell to cell movement.

The TGB 2 (molecular weight 11 kDa) and TGB 3 (molecular weight 10 kDa) proteins associate with the endoplasmic reticulum.

The coat protein has a molecular weight of ~25 kDa.

The 3' untranslated region is ~100 nucleotides in length.

== Life cycle ==
Viral replication is cytoplasmic. Entry into the host cell is achieved by penetration into the host cell. Replication follows the positive stranded RNA virus replication model. Positive stranded RNA virus transcription is the method of transcription. Translation takes place by leaky scanning. The virus exits the host cell by tripartite non-tubule guided viral movement. The virus is transmitted via a vector (insects). Transmission routes are vector and mechanical.

Genus	Host details	Tissue tropism	Entry details	Release details	Replication site	Assembly site	Transmission
Potexvirus	Plants	None	Viral movement; mechanical inoculation	Viral movement	Cytoplasm	Cytoplasm	Insects

== Hosts ==
Known hosts are various flowering plants.

== Distribution ==
These viruses appear to occur worldwide.
