= Cassava common mosaic virus =

Virus classification
- (unranked): Virus
- Realm: Riboviria
- Kingdom: Orthornavirae
- Phylum: Kitrinoviricota
- Class: Alsuviricetes
- Order: Tymovirales
- Family: Alphaflexiviridae
- Genus: Potexvirus
- Species: Potexvirus marmormanihotis

Synonyms
- Brazilian cassava common mosaic virus

Pathogenic virus

Cassava common mosaic virus (CsCMV) is a plant pathogenic virus.

== Distribution ==
Colombia, Brazil, isolated cases in Africa and Asia.
