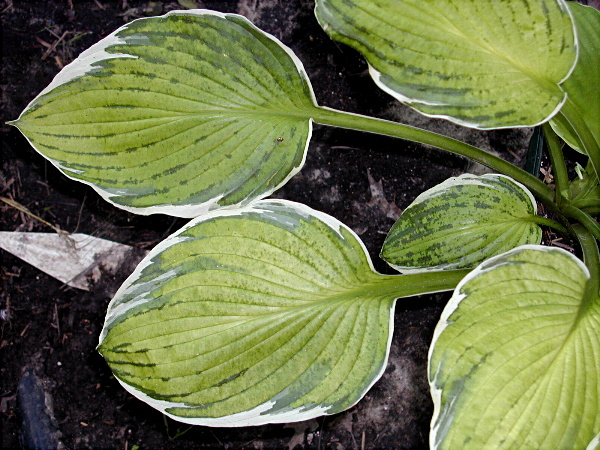
- Hosta 'Moonlight' cultivar infected with Hosta virus X

Virus classification
- (unranked): Virus
- Realm: Riboviria
- Kingdom: Orthornavirae
- Phylum: Kitrinoviricota
- Class: Alsuviricetes
- Order: Tymovirales
- Family: Alphaflexiviridae
- Genus: Potexvirus
- Species: Potexvirus ecshostae

= Hosta virus X =

Species of virus

Hosta virus X (HVX) is a virus that infects hostas. The disease was first identified in 1996 by Benham Lockhart at the University of Minnesota, and grouped with the potexviruses. The virus has reached epidemic proportions and is not uncommon to find in many garden centers and nurseries.

== Emergence ==
Hosta virus X began showing up in nurseries in the early 2000's. Infected hostas were initially purchased by some people who believed them to be new cultivars of the plant. Hosta cultivars such as "Break Dance," "Eternal Father," "Leopard Frog," "Blue Freckles," and "Lunacy" were not new cultivars, but were hostas infected with Hosta virus X that were mistakenly believed to be new cultivars. Some of the infected hostas also made their way into European growers.

Eventually, the virus reached the large growers in the Netherlands, and caused the virus to spread quickly.

== Signs and symptoms ==
Hosta virus X does not kill the infected plants, but causes a variety of symptoms such as:

- Ink-bleed, which makes the plant look discolored in certain spots, and this effect is generally centered on a vein. An example of this is shown in the photo in this article.
- Collapsed tissue, which can be signs of heavier infection, makes the leaf tissue look flattened and empty.
- Mottling, which makes the plant appear blotchy. This is not always a symptom of HVX, and could be from another virus, but it should always be treated as a virus infected plant regardless.

A hosta may no longer express symptoms of the virus when it grows back in the Spring, even though it may have shown symptoms in a previous year. Nonetheless, the plant should still be considered infected with HVX. A hosta infected with the virus may also be asymptomatic. Some plants in a study conducted by Dr. Lockhart at the University of Minnesota did not show symptoms for up to 3 years after testing positive for the virus.

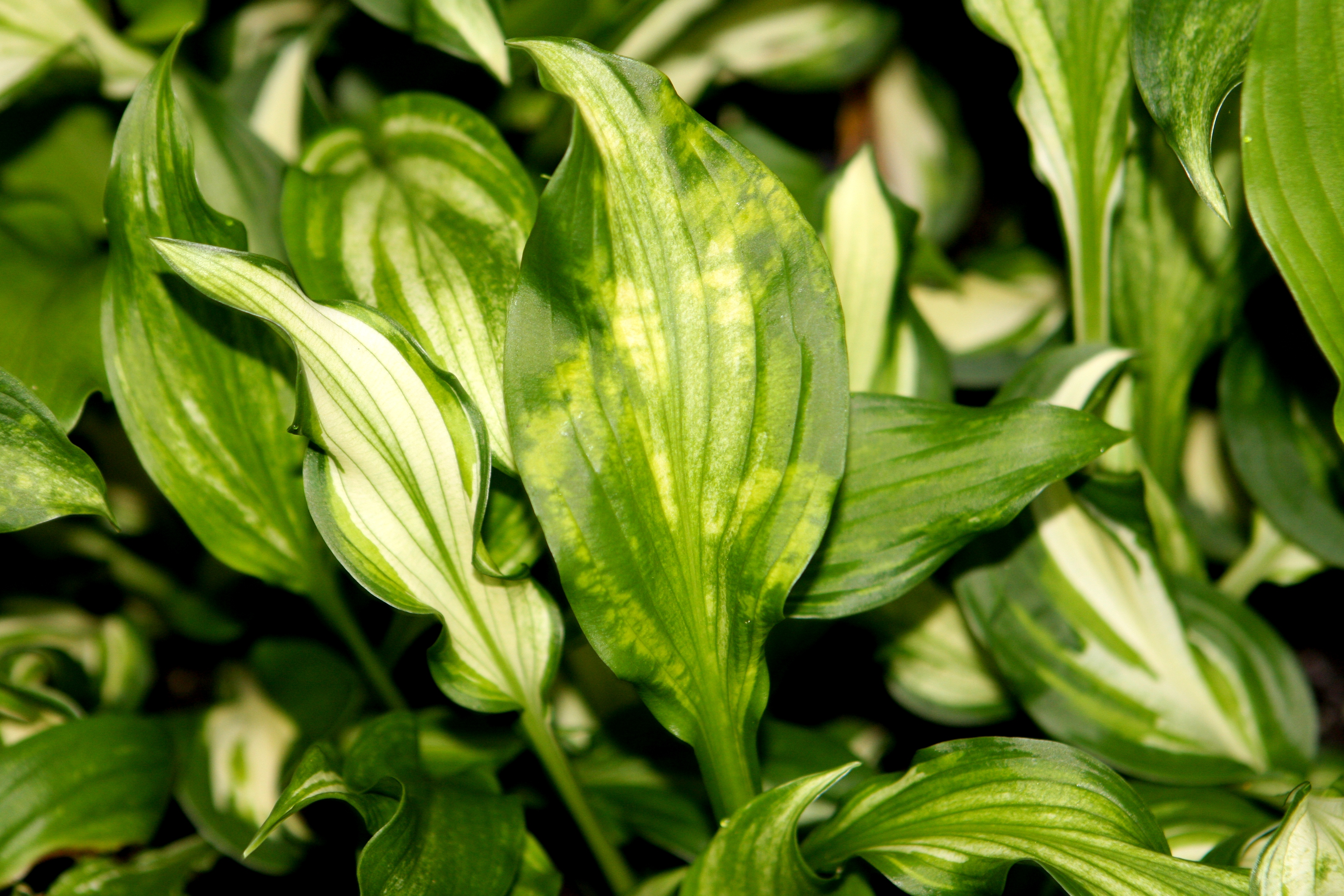
Infected Hosta 'Undulata Univittata' with Virus X

== Control ==
The primary concern with HVX is its ability to spread prolifically. Once a hosta plant is infected, it will be infected for the rest of its life. Any plant suspected of being infected should be burned if it is legal to do so. If it is not, then it should be tossed in the landfill, but infected hosta plants should never be composted. If any plant in a batch shows symptoms, the entire batch should be considered infected and be destroyed.

The virus primarily spreads through infected sap, so dividing or cutting multiple plants by hand or with the same tool can spread the virus. Handling the roots also spreads the virus easily. Animals may also spread the virus through the sap by eating from an infected plant and then eating from an uninfected plant, though this has not been proven. Other unidentified vectors may exist.

People who wish to buy hostas may request proof from the seller that the hosta is HVX-free before purchase. After purchase, even if test results come back negative for HVX, hostas suspected of being infected should be quarantined for a year or more away from other hostas and be observed to see if it presents any symptoms.

== Virus structure ==
The virus is about 530nm in length, and has a weight of 27 kDa. The virus shape is filamentous.
