= Botrexvirus =

Virus classification
- (unranked): Virus
- Realm: Riboviria
- Kingdom: Orthornavirae
- Phylum: Kitrinoviricota
- Class: Alsuviricetes
- Order: Tymovirales
- Family: Alphaflexiviridae
- Genus: Botrexvirus

Genus of viruses

Botrexvirus is a genus of viruses in the order Tymovirales, in the family Alphaflexiviridae. Fungi serve as natural hosts. There are three species in the genus.

== Taxonomy ==
The genus contains the following species, listed by scientific name and followed by their common names:

- Botrexvirus duosclerotiniae, Sclerotinia sclerotiorum alphaflexivirus 2
- Botrexvirus ecsbotrytis, Botrytis virus X
- Botrexvirus unosclerotiniae, Sclerotinia sclerotiorum alphaflexivirus 1

== Structure ==
Viruses in Botrexvirus are non-enveloped, with flexuous and filamentous geometries. The diameter is around 12-13 nm, with a length of 720 nm. Genomes are linear, around 7kb in length. The genome codes for 5 proteins.

Genus	Structure	Symmetry	Capsid	Genomic arrangement	Genomic segmentation
Botrexvirus	Filamentous		Non-enveloped	Linear	Monopartite

== Life cycle ==
Viral replication is cytoplasmic. Entry into the host cell is achieved by penetration into the host cell. Replication follows the positive stranded RNA virus replication model. Positive stranded RNA virus transcription is the method of transcription. The virus exits the host cell by tripartite non-tubule guided viral movement. Fungi serve as the natural host.

Genus	Host details	Tissue tropism	Entry details	Release details	Replication site	Assembly site	Transmission
Botrexvirus	Plants	None	Viral movement; mechanical inoculation	Viral movement	Cytoplasm	Cytoplasm	Unknown
