= Alliance for a Green Revolution in Africa =

Agricultural development organization

AGRA
- Formation: 2006
- Founders: Gates Foundation, Rockefeller Foundation
- Type: Non-profit organization
- Headquarters: Nairobi, Kenya
- Region served: Africa
- Chairman: Hailemariam Desalegn
- President: Alice Ruhweza
- Employees: 211
- Website: agra.org
- Formerly called: Alliance for Green Revolution in Africa

AGRA, formerly known as the Alliance for Green Revolution in Africa, is a nonprofit organization founded in 2006 to improve agricultural practices in Africa, with the goals of doubling the income of 20 million farmers and halving food insecurity in 20 countries by 2020.

AGRA is headquartered in Nairobi, Kenya, from where a team of African scientists, economists and business leaders supports its country operations and African governments. It was funded by the Gates Foundation and the Rockefeller Foundation. The institution has offices in 11 African countries.

== History ==
AGRA was founded in 2006 as an Africa-based and -led organization that works within the Comprehensive Africa Agricultural Development Program (CAADP), Africa's policy framework for agricultural transformation, wealth creation, food security and nutrition, economic growth and prosperity.

Former UN Secretary General Kofi Annan was the organization's first chairman and served until 2013 when Econet Wireless Founder Strive Masiyiwa took over. Masiyiwa's term ended in 2019. He was succeeded by former Ethiopian Prime Minister Hailemariam Desalegn.

AGRA has 211 employees from 24 nationalities of whom 42% are female and 58% male. About 61% of AGRA's workers are technical staff. The organization is led by President Alice Ruhweza, who has held the office since 2025. She is deputized by Prof. Hamadi Boga, Former Principal Secretary, in the State Department of Crop Development and Agricultural Research in Kenya and Jonathan Said.

AGRA is among the key conveners of the annual Africa Food Systems Forum (AFSF), a gathering that brings together presidents, heads of state and government, ministers, scientists, farmers, private sector payers and members of civil society to chart the way forward for African agriculture. The Forum is now in its 20th year.

In January 2026, Claire Wilmot for The Bureau of Investigative Journalism wrote that AGRA hired Portland Communications, which in turn used subcontractors to edit Wikipedia entries favorably for AGRA and other clients.

== Countries of operation ==
AGRA has prioritized 12 countries in three agro-ecologies:

- The Guinea Savannah Zone: Ghana, Nigeria, Mali and Burkina Faso
- The East African Highlands: Ethiopia, Kenya, Uganda, Rwanda and Tanzania
- The Miombo Woodland: Malawi, Mozambique and Zambia

== Strategy ==
AGRA's strategy is to double the yields and incomes of 30 million smallholder households in 11 countries by the end of 2021. The organization's impact is felt by:

- 9 million smallholder farmer households, who are witnessing increased food security through AGRA's direct interventions.
- 21 million smallholder farmer households that are benefiting indirectly from AGRA's partnerships, support to governments and Investments that unlock the engagement and power of the private sector.

According to the AGRA's Half-Year 2020 M&E Progress Report, 10.14 million farmers (76% of the target) are benefitting from extension activities and 7.72 million farmers adopted improved and yield-enhancing technologies. Farmers benefitting from AGRA's support reported an increase in the number of months with sufficient food supply from 9.2 in 2016 to 11 months in 2019.

=== Strategic partners ===
AGRA is primarily guided by its partners across the continent, starting with the leadership of African states through the Comprehensive Africa Agriculture Development Programme (CAADP) coordination under the Malabo declaration. AGRA works closely with African governments, particularly in its eleven countries of operation, to whom it is accountable under national ownership of development leadership and governance. AGRA works under national development plans and National Agriculture Investment Plans. It also works in partnership with other national actors in the private sector, farmers organizations, the academic and research community, and civil society.

== Projects ==
- Development of disease-resistant strains of cassava. The genetically-engineered cassava are reportedly immune to cassava brown streak virus disease and the cassava common mosaic virus.
- PhD programs at universities in Ghana and South Africa

== Critiques ==
Publications by the Oakland Institute have suggested that AGRA was planned without African voices and imposes quick-fix technological solutions on complex and historically deep social issues. It will impose a regime in which farmers lose power over their own seeds and are forced to buy them back from large corporations year after year. This system may also contribute to the marginalization of women. The conference compiled a set of papers containing various arguments: There are also suggestions that hunger in Africa results more from poverty than from actual food shortages; people will not be able to buy any additional food that gets produced without larger systemic changes.

In 2021, the Alliance for Food Sovereignty in Africa released an open letter with many signatories stating that AGRA had "failed in its mission to increase productivity and incomes and reduce food insecurity". In 2025 a renewed letter was published, with 600 signatories.

== Publications ==
Africa Agriculture Status Report – An annual publication highlighting the major trends in African agriculture, the drivers of those trends, and the emerging challenges that Africa's food systems face.

Food Security Monitor – A monthly publication providing the food security outlook in AGRA's focus countries in Africa.

AGRA Annual Reports.
