= Lolavirus =

Virus classification
- (unranked): Virus
- Realm: Riboviria
- Kingdom: Orthornavirae
- Phylum: Kitrinoviricota
- Class: Alsuviricetes
- Order: Tymovirales
- Family: Alphaflexiviridae
- Genus: Lolavirus

Genus of viruses

Lolavirus is a genus of viruses in the order Tymovirales, in the family Alphaflexiviridae. Plants, specifically ryegrass, serve as natural hosts. There is only one species in this genus: Lolium latent virus (Lolavirus latenslolii).

== Structure ==
Viruses in Lolavirus are non-enveloped, with flexuous and filamentous geometries. The diameter is around 13 nm, with a length of 640 nm. Genomes are linear, around 7.6kb in length, with five open reading frames that encode the replication-associated protein, the movement-associated triple gene block proteins, and the coat protein (which is cleaved into two parts weighing about 28 and 33 kDa). The genome codes for 6 proteins.

Genus	Structure	Symmetry	Capsid	Genomic arrangement	Genomic segmentation
Lolavirus	Filamentous		Non-enveloped	Linear	Monopartite

== Life cycle ==
Viral replication is cytoplasmic, and is lysogenic. Entry into the host cell is achieved by penetration into the host cell. Replication follows the positive stranded RNA virus replication model. Positive stranded RNA virus transcription is the method of transcription. The virus exits the host cell by tripartite non-tubule guided viral movement. Plants serve as the natural host.

Genus	Host details	Tissue tropism	Entry details	Release details	Replication site	Assembly site	Transmission
Lolavirus	Plants	None	Viral movement; mechanical inoculation	Viral movement	Cytoplasm	Cytoplasm	Unknown
