= Bamboo mosaic potexvirus (BaMV) cis-regulatory element =

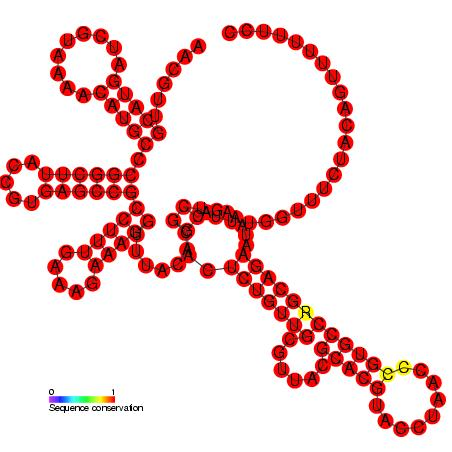
- Predicted secondary structure and sequence conservation of BaMV_CRE

Identifiers
- Symbol: BaMV_CRE
- Rfam: RF00290

Other data
- RNA type: Cis-reg
- Domain(s): Viruses
- SO: SO:0000233
- PDB structures: PDBe

The Bamboo mosaic potexvirus (BaMV) cis-regulatory element represents a cloverleaf-like cis-regulatory element found in the 3' UTR of the bamboo mosaic virus. This family is thought to play an important role in the initiation of minus-strand RNA synthesis and may also be involved in the regulation of viral replication.

== See also ==
- Bamboo mosaic virus satellite RNA cis-regulatory element
