= Asparagus virus 3 =

Virus classification
- (unranked): Virus
- Realm: Riboviria
- Kingdom: Orthornavirae
- Phylum: Kitrinoviricota
- Class: Alsuviricetes
- Order: Tymovirales
- Family: Alphaflexiviridae
- Genus: Potexvirus
- Species: Potexvirus triasparagi

Strains
- Asparagus virus 3; Scallion virus X

Species of virus

Asparagus virus 3 is a pathogenic plant virus in the family Alphaflexiviridae.
