= Potato virus X cis-acting regulatory element =

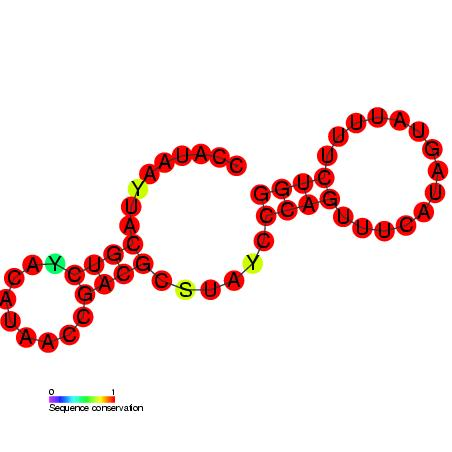
- Predicted secondary structure and sequence conservation of PVX_3

Identifiers
- Symbol: PVX_3
- Alt. Symbols: PVX_cis-reg
- Rfam: RF00184

Other data
- RNA type: Cis-reg
- Domain(s): Viruses
- SO: SO:0000205
- PDB structures: PDBe

The Potato virus X cis-acting regulatory element is a cis-acting regulatory element found in the 3' UTR of the Potato virus X genome. This element has been found to be required for minus strand RNA accumulation and is essential for efficient viral replication.

== See also ==
- Poxvirus AX element late mRNA cis-regulatory element
