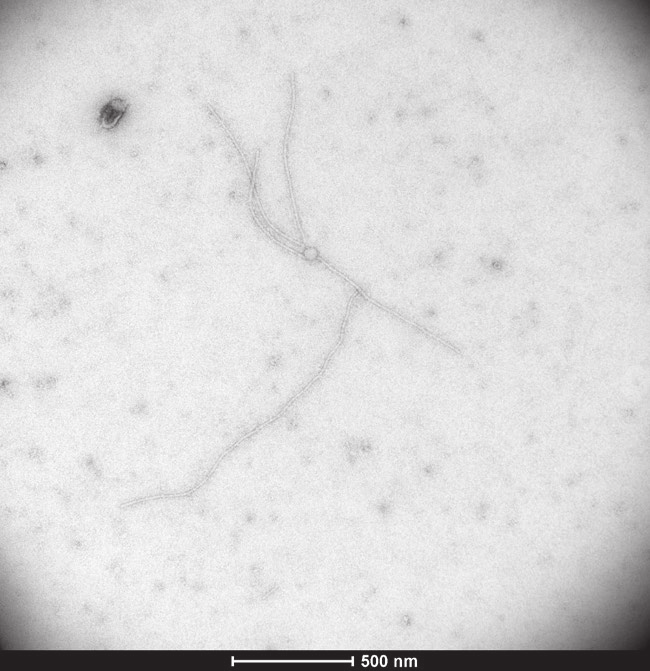
- Transmission electron microscopy photograph of Allexivirus

Virus classification
- (unranked): Virus
- Realm: Riboviria
- Kingdom: Orthornavirae
- Phylum: Kitrinoviricota
- Class: Alsuviricetes
- Order: Tymovirales
- Family: Alphaflexiviridae
- Genus: Allexivirus

Species
- See text

= Allexivirus =

Genus of viruses

Allexivirus is a genus of viruses in the order Tymovirales, in the family Alphaflexiviridae. Shallot, onion, and garlic serve as natural hosts. There are 15 species in this genus, seven of which are assigned to a subgenus. Diseases associated with this genus include: mosaic and ringspot symptoms.

== Taxonomy ==
The following species are assigned to the genus, listed by scientific name and followed by the exemplar virus of the species:

- Subgenus: Acarallexivirus
  - Allexivirus alphallii, Garlic virus A
  - Allexivirus betallii, Garlic virus B
  - Allexivirus chiallii, Garlic virus C
  - Allexivirus deltallii, Garlic virus D
  - Allexivirus ecsallii, Garlic virus X
  - Allexivirus ecsascalonicum, Shallot virus X
  - Allexivirus epsalii, Garlic virus E
- Species not assigned to a subgenus:
  - Allexivirus epsilonrubi, Blackberry virus E
  - Allexivirus filumallii, Garlic mite-borne filamentous virus
  - Allexivirus latensvanillae, Vanilla latent virus
  - Allexivirus pintoi, Arachis pintoi virus
  - Allexivirus rehmanniae, Rehmannia allexivirus
  - Allexivirus sauroandrogyni, Sauropus androgynus virus
  - Allexivirus sennae, Senna severe yellow mosaic virus
  - Allexivirus sigmamedicagonis, Alfalfa virus S

== Structure ==
Viruses in Allexivirus are non-enveloped, with flexuous and filamentous geometries. The diameter is around 12 nm, with a length of 800 nm. Genomes are linear, around 9kb in length. The genome codes for 6 proteins.

Genus	Structure	Symmetry	Capsid	Genomic arrangement	Genomic segmentation
Allexivirus	Filamentous		Non-enveloped	Linear	Monopartite

== Life cycle ==
Viral replication is cytoplasmic. Entry into the host cell is achieved by penetration into the host cell. Replication follows the positive stranded RNA virus replication model. Positive stranded RNA virus transcription is the method of transcription. The virus exits the host cell by tripartite non-tubule guided viral movement. Shallot, onion, and garlic serve as the natural host. The virus is transmitted via a vector (mite). Transmission routes are vector and mechanical.

Genus	Host details	Tissue tropism	Entry details	Release details	Replication site	Assembly site	Transmission
Allexivirus	Plants: Shallot; plants: onion; plants: garlic	None	Viral movement; mechanical inoculation	Viral movement	Cytoplasm	Cytoplasm	Mites
