= Poxvirus AX element late mRNA cis-regulatory element =

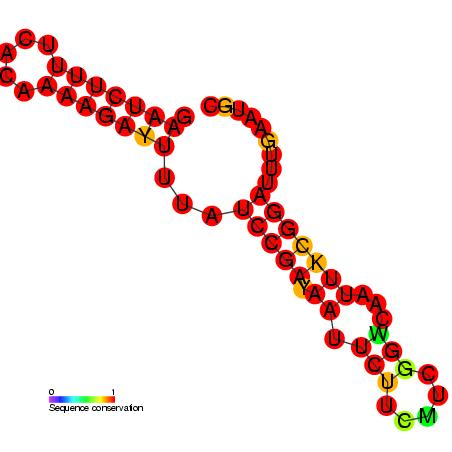
- Predicted secondary structure and sequence conservation of Pox_AX_element

Identifiers
- Symbol: Pox_AX_element
- Rfam: RF00384

Other data
- RNA type: Cis-reg
- Domain(s): Viruses
- SO: SO:0000233
- PDB structures: PDBe

The Poxvirus AX element late mRNA family represents a cis-regulatory element present at the 3' end of poxvirus late ATI mRNA and is known as the AX element. The AX element is involved in directing the efficient production and orientation-dependent formation of late RNAs. It is likely that this element directs the endonucleolytic cleavage of the transcript. It has been shown that the F17R late mRNA transcript which is also cleaved is also likely to share a common factor in their mechanism despite a lack of any obvious similarity in its cis-regulatory RNA element.

== See also ==
- Potato virus X cis-acting regulatory element
