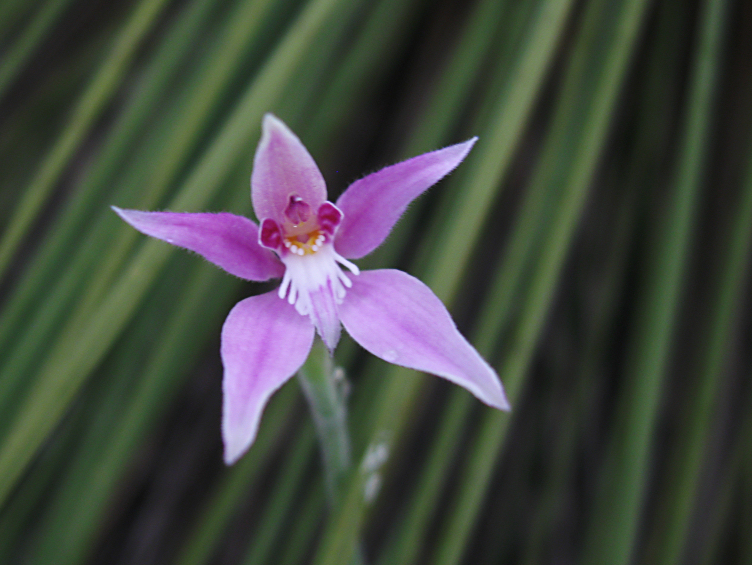

Scientific classification
- Kingdom: Plantae
- Clade: Tracheophytes
- Clade: Angiosperms
- Clade: Monocots
- Order: Asparagales
- Family: Orchidaceae
- Subfamily: Orchidoideae
- Tribe: Diurideae
- Genus: Caladenia
- Species: C. latifolia

Binomial name
- Caladenia latifolia R.Br.

Synonyms
- Caladeniastrum latifolium (R.Br.) Szlach. & Rutk.

= Caladenia latifolia =

Pink fairy orchid

Species of orchid

Caladenia latifolia, commonly known as pink fairies is a species of orchid endemic to Australia and is common and widespread in the southern half of the continent and in Tasmania. It has a single, hairy leaf and up to four pink (rarely white) flowers. It is easily distinguished by its relatively large, green leaf, and pink flowers on an unusually tall spike.

== Description ==
Caladenia latifolia is a terrestrial, perennial, deciduous, herb with an underground tuber and which often grows in large colonies. It has a single, oblong to lance-shaped leaf, 80–180 mm (3–7 in) long and 3–30 mm (0.1–1 in) wide. The leaf usually lies flat on the ground and is green and densely hairy on both sides. Up to four pink (or rarely, white with pink markings) flowers 20–40 mm (0.8–2 in) long and 20–30 mm (0.8–1 in) wide are borne on a stalk 200–450 mm (8–20 in) tall. The back surface of the sepals and petal is a covered with glandular hairs and is a lighter shade of pink. The dorsal sepal is erect, oblong to lance-shaped, 12–16 mm (0.5–0.6 in) long and 3–4 mm (0.1–0.2 in) wide. The lateral sepals are 13–17 mm (0.5–0.7 in) long, 4–6 mm (0.16–0.24 in) wide and spread widely. The petals are 10–14 mm (0.4–0.6 in) long and 3–4 mm (0.1–0.2 in) wide, spread widely and sometimes have a few irregular teeth on the sides. The labellum is 5–8 mm (0.2–0.3 in) long, 6–9 mm (0.2–0.4 in) wide, pink or white and has three distinct lobes. The lateral lobes are pink with dark stripes, narrow oblong in shape, and sometimes have small teeth on the edge. The mid-lobe is white with a pinkish tip, triangular in shape and has three or four long, linear teeth on each side. There are two rows of yellowish calli with white tips in the centre of the labellum, forming a semi-circle. Flowering occurs from August to December.

This orchid sometimes forms hybrids with the cherry spider orchid (Caladenia gardneri) and with the cowslip orchid (Caladenia flava). On rare occasions it hybridises with the large white spider orchid (Caladenia longicauda subsp. longicauda).

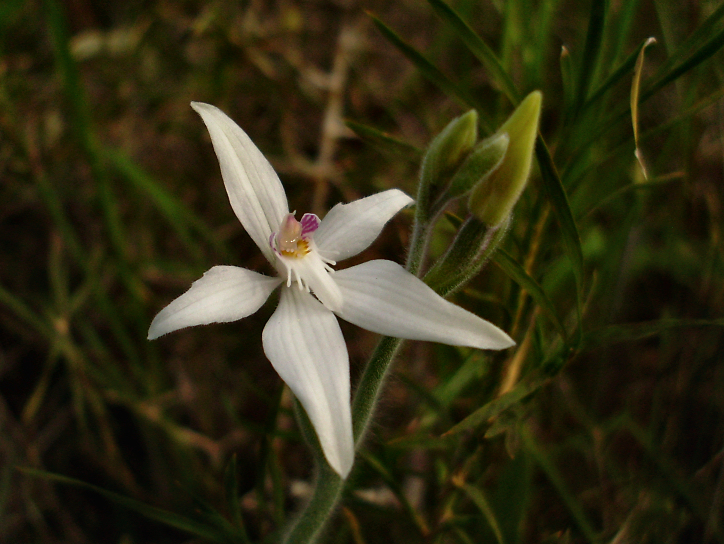
Caladenia latifolia white form

== Taxonomy and naming ==
Caladenia latifolia was first described in 1810 by Robert Brown and the description was published in Prodromus Florae Novae Hollandiae. The specific epithet (latifolia) is derived from the Latin latus meaning "broad" and folium meaning "leaf", referring to the broad leaf of this species.

Four varieties have been described:

- Caladenia latifolia var. angustifolia Benth.
- Caladenia latifolia var. glandula Ewart & B.Wood
- Caladenia latifolia R.Br. var. latifolia

== Distribution and habitat ==
Pink fairies occurs in Victoria, South Australia, Tasmania and Western Australia. In Victoria it mostly grows in near-coastal areas in sand and is only rarely found inland. In South Australia it is widespread in the south east where it grows in sand in near coastal areas. In Tasmania it grows in coastal scrub and heath in the north of the island. In Western Australia, pink fairies occurs between Kalbarri in the north and Israelite Bay in the south, growing in a wide range of habitats from coastal heath to the margins of inland salt lakes.

== Conservation ==
In Western Australia C. latifolia is classified as "Not Threatened" by the Western Australian Government Department of Parks and Wildlife.
