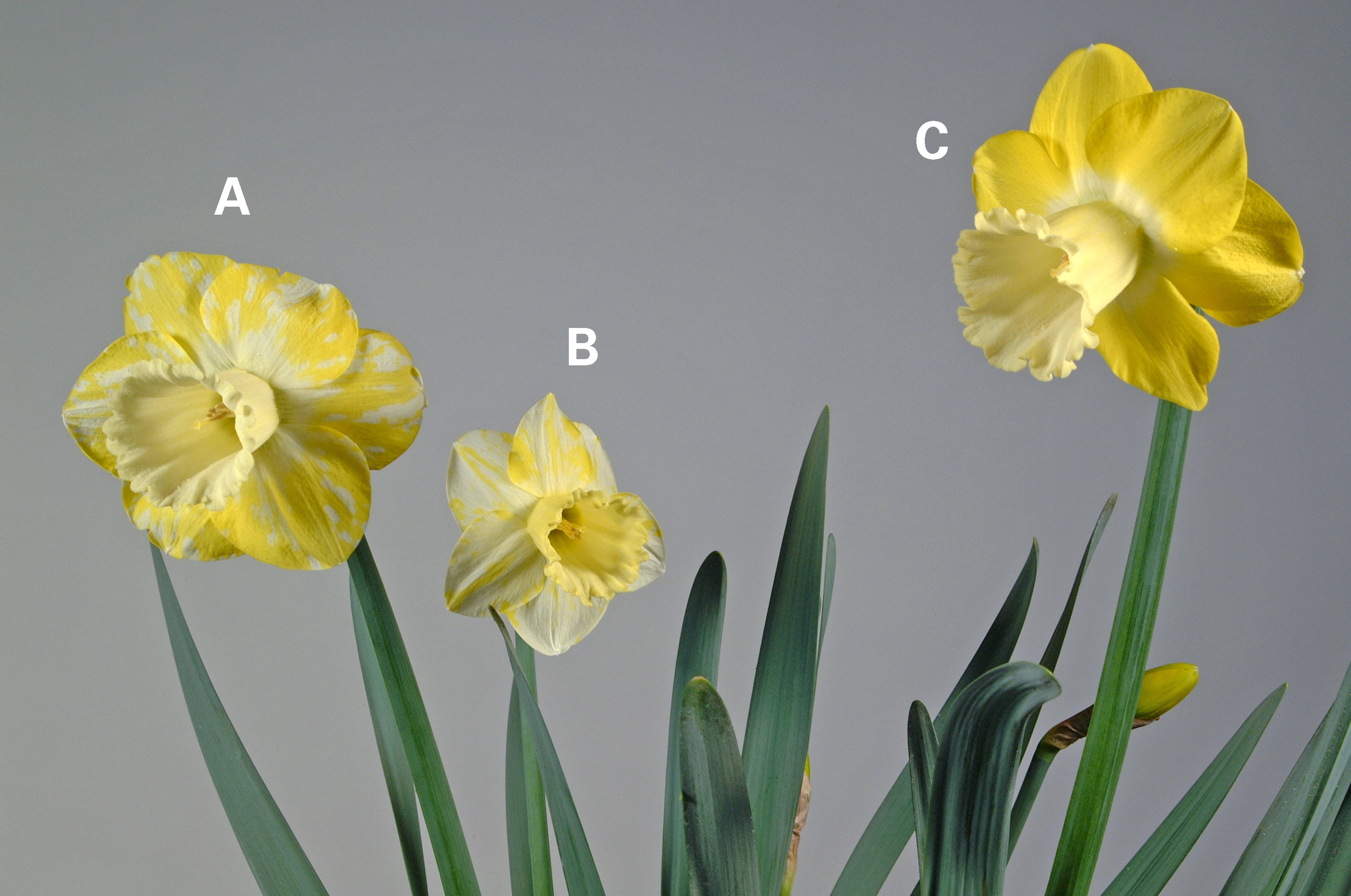
- Color break symptoms caused by narcissus mosaic virus (NMV) in daffodils (A, B) and normal flower (C)

Virus classification
- (unranked): Virus
- Realm: Riboviria
- Kingdom: Orthornavirae
- Phylum: Kitrinoviricota
- Class: Alsuviricetes
- Order: Tymovirales
- Family: Alphaflexiviridae
- Genus: Potexvirus
- Species: Potexvirus narcissi

= Narcissus mosaic virus =

Species of virus

Narcissus mosaic virus (NMV) is a plant pathogenic virus in the genus Potexvirus and family Alphaflexiviridae, which infects Narcissus. It can also affect Iris (plants).

== Description ==
Isolated in the Netherlands and the UK from Narcissus pseudonarcissus in 1946, it is generally symptom less.

== Gallery ==
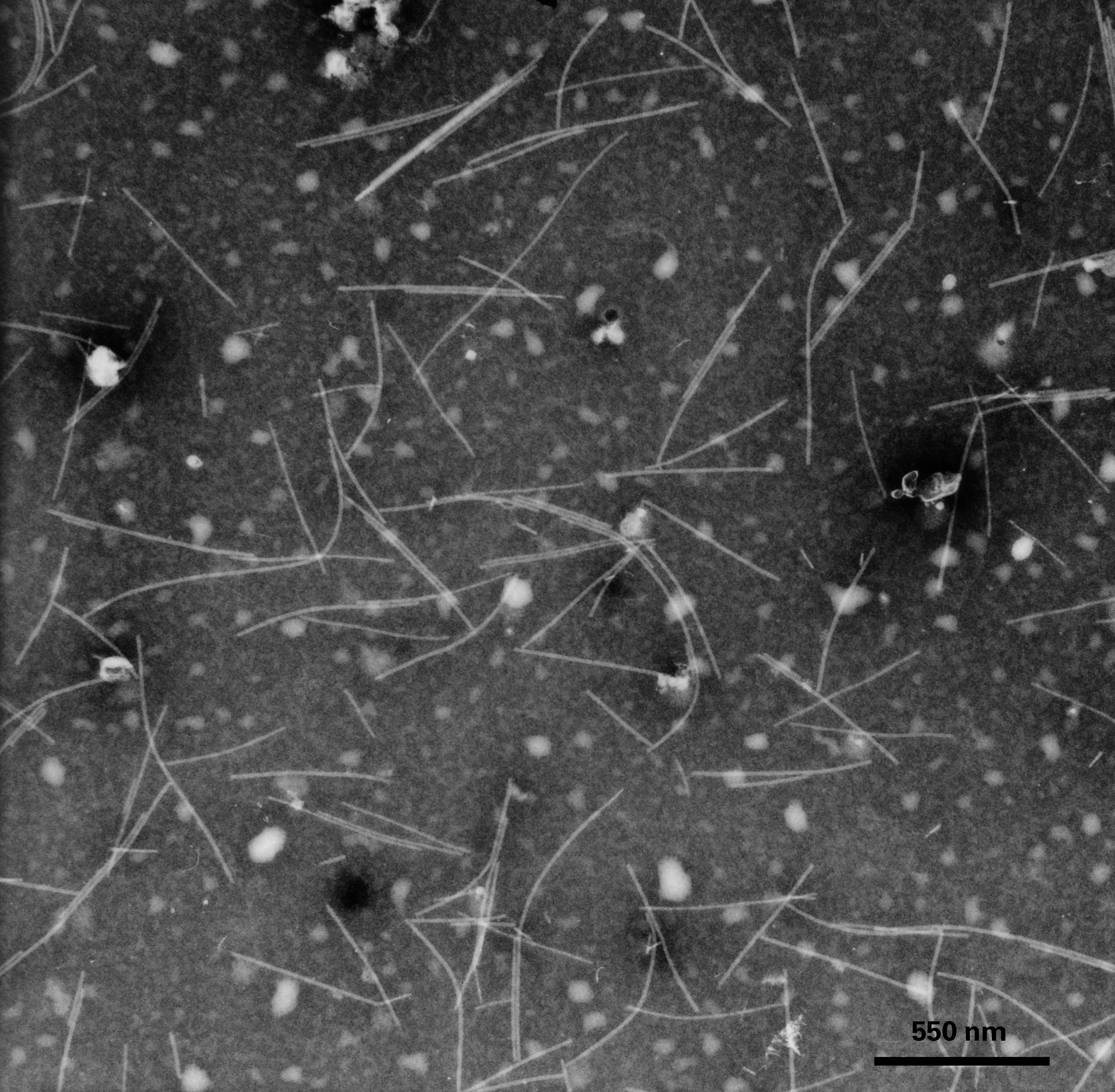
Electron micrograph of NMV

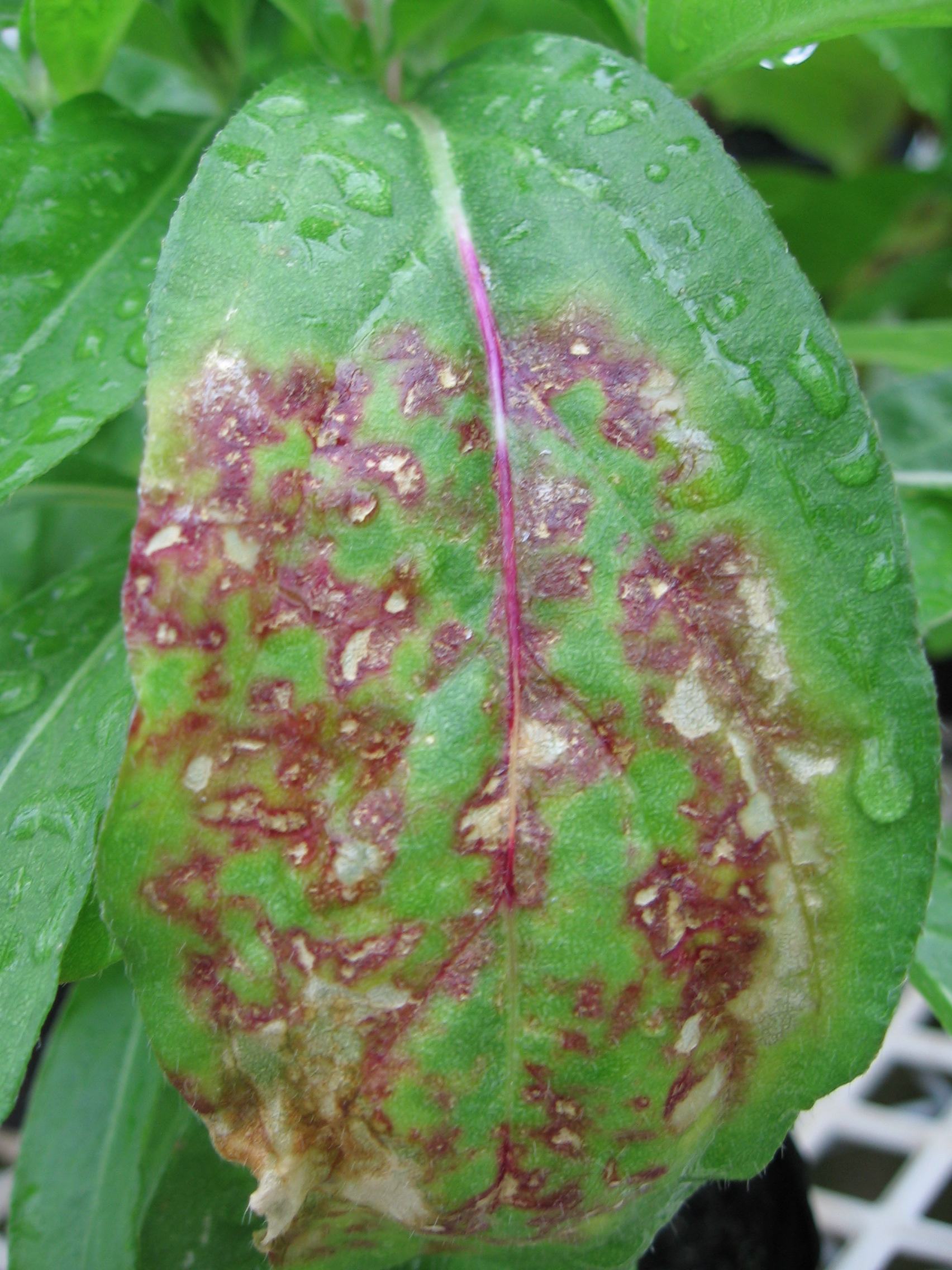
Red ringspot lesions caused by NMV in Gomphrena globosa
