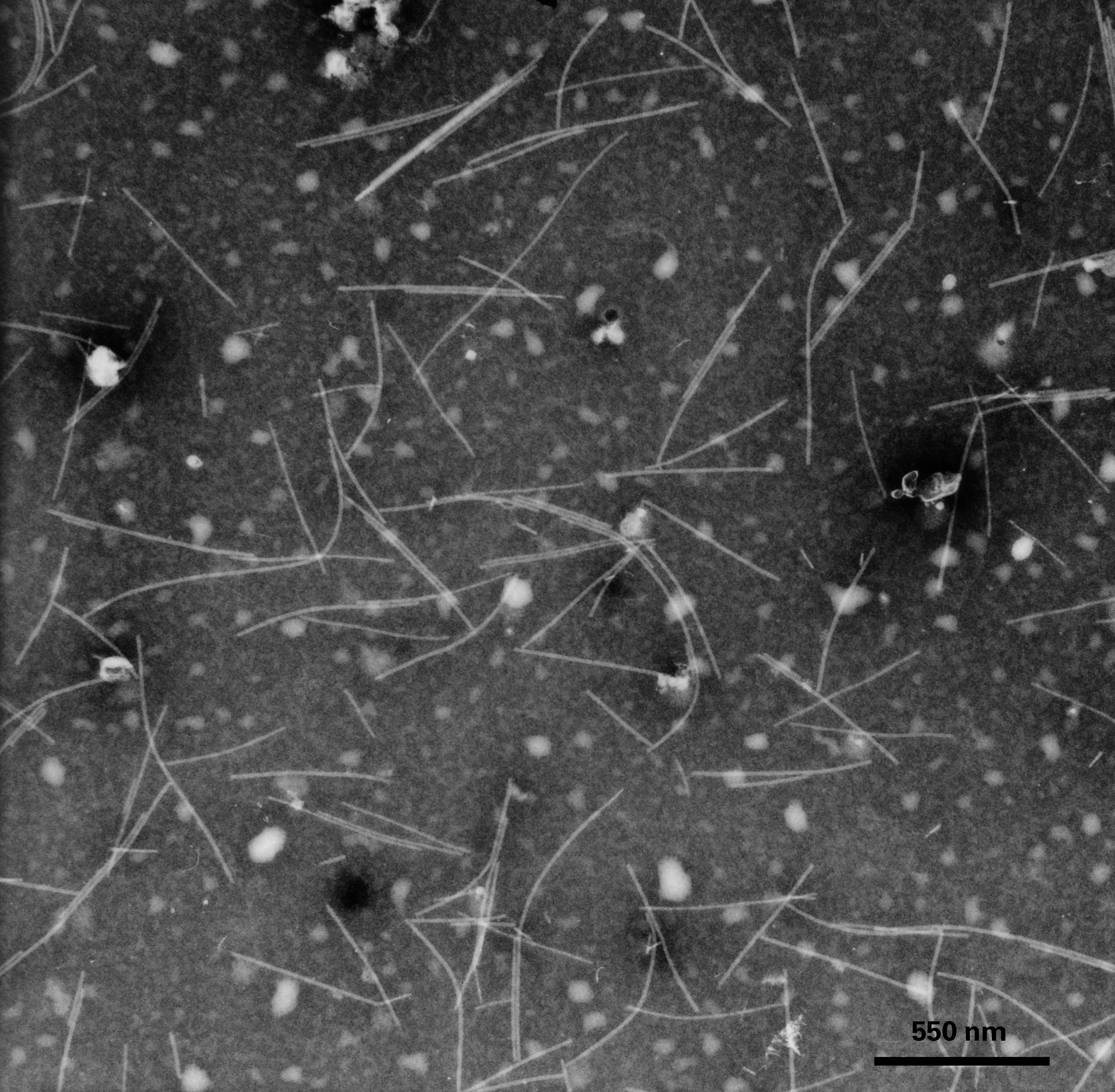
- Electron micrograph of narcissus mosaic virus (NMV) filamentous virions

Virus classification
- (unranked): Virus
- Realm: Riboviria
- Kingdom: Orthornavirae
- Phylum: Kitrinoviricota
- Class: Alsuviricetes
- Order: Tymovirales
- Family: Alphaflexiviridae

= Alphaflexiviridae =

Family of viruses in the order Tymovirales affecting plants and fungi

Alphaflexiviridae is a family of viruses in the order Tymovirales. Plants and fungi serve as natural hosts. There are six genera in the family. Diseases associated with this family include: mosaic and ringspot symptoms.

== Taxonomy ==
The following genera are recognized:

- Allexivirus
- Botrexvirus
- Lolavirus
- Platypuvirus
- Potexvirus
- Sclerodarnavirus

== Structure ==
Viruses in the genus Alphaflexiviridae are non-enveloped, with flexuous and filamentous geometries. The diameter is around 12-13 nm. Genomes are linear, around 5.4-9kb in length. The genome codes for 1 to 6 proteins.

== Life cycle ==
Viral replication is cytoplasmic, and is lysogenic. Entry into the host cell is achieved by penetration into the host cell. Replication follows the positive stranded RNA virus replication model. Positive stranded RNA virus transcription is the method of transcription. Translation takes place by leaky scanning. The virus exits the host cell by tripartite non-tubule guided viral movement. Plants and fungi serve as the natural host. The virus is transmitted via a vector (insects). Transmission routes are vector and mechanical.
