= Garlic common latent virus =

Virus classification
- (unranked): Virus
- Realm: Riboviria
- Kingdom: Orthornavirae
- Phylum: Kitrinoviricota
- Class: Alsuviricetes
- Order: Tymovirales
- Family: Betaflexiviridae
- Genus: Carlavirus
- Species: Carlavirus latensallii

Species of virus

Garlic common latent virus (GarCLV) is a plant virus member of the genus Carlavirus that has been found infecting garlic globally. Detection of the virus in leek and onion has also been reported.

== Epidemiology ==
GarCLV main transmission is through propagation material. As a result, it is often widespread among garlic crop. The virus single infection in garlic is usually symptomless, but in mixed infections with leek yellow stripe virus (LYSV, Potyvirus) or onion yellow dwarf virus (OYDV, Potyvirus) could form ‘garlic viral complex’ which increases severity of the other viruses infection. Other Allium spp. such as Allium caeruleum, Allium cristophii, Allium cyathophorum, Allium nutans, Allium schoenoprasum, Allium scorodoprasum, Allium senescens subsp. montanum, and Allium sphaerocephalon had also been reported to be infected by GarCLV.

== Genome ==
The virus complete genome, excluding poly-(A) tail, is 8,353 nt long, and contains six open reading frame (ORFs). ORFs 2, 3, 4 are triple gene block (TGB) which encodes movement protein, while ORF5 is the viral coat protein (CP) encoding sequence.

== Phylogeny ==
Earlier phylogenetic analyses based on capsid (CP) gene suggested that global GarCLV isolates were highly similar and can be divided into two major groups only. However, the latest Phylogenetic trees constructed using complete nucleotide sequences of each of TGB and CP gene clustered global isolates available in NCBI GenBank into three major clades. Isolates in the third group have high genetic variability among themselves and to isolates in the two other groups, and also seems to be more rarely found in the nature. The subsequent population study suggested that both genes were under negative selection pressure, with pressure on CP were more intense than on TGB. As consequences, TGB gene has higher genetic variations than CP gene. The high variations on TGB gene sequences probably reduced vitality of some isolates, especially those belong to highly variable Clade 3, which could be one of reasons for the rarity of Clade 3 isolates in the nature.
