= Shallot latent virus =

Virus classification
- (unranked): Virus
- Realm: Riboviria
- Kingdom: Orthornavirae
- Phylum: Kitrinoviricota
- Class: Alsuviricetes
- Order: Tymovirales
- Family: Betaflexiviridae
- Genus: Carlavirus
- Species: Carlavirus latensascalonici

Species of virus

Shallot latent virus (SLV), a species of Carlavirus, was first identified in shallots in Netherlands. The virus particle is elongated, 650 nm in length.

== Epidemiology ==
Since its first detection in shallots, SLV has been found infecting garlic, onion, and leek on five continents. In Indonesia, the virus has been identified in shallot, which is widely grown and used as a food ingredient, and also in garlic. In Turkey, where shallot is less commonly cultivated, SLV was identified in onion in Amasya province instead. However, SLV was not detected in onion samples collected in Ankara province. Molecular study also detected SLV in other Allium species such as Allium cyathophorum, Allium moly, Allium scorodoprasum, and Allium senescens subsp. montanum.

The virus is widespread in shallot and garlic without causing any clear symptoms, hence its name 'latent'. However, in mixed infection with leek yellow stripe virus (LYSV, Potyvirus) induces severe chlorotic and white stripes on shallot leaves. The aphids Myzus ascalonicus and Aphis fabae transmit SLV in a non-persistent manner, but Myzus persicae does not transmit the virus. It is also mechanically transmitted.

== Genome ==
SLV genome (excluding poly-A tail) is around 8338 nt in length.
