= List of pea diseases =

This article is a list of diseases of peas (Pisum sativum).

== Bacterial diseases ==
Bacterial diseases
Bacterial blight	Pseudomonas syringae pv. pisi
Brown spot	Pseudomonas syringae pv. syringae

== Fungal diseases ==
Fungal diseases
Alternaria blight	Alternaria alternata
Anthracnos	Colletotrichum gloeosporioides = Colletotrichum pisi Glomerella cingulata [teleomorph]
Aphanomyces root rot	Aphanomyces euteiches f.sp. pisi
Ascochyta blight	Mycosphaerella pinodes Ascochyta pinodes [anamorph]
Ascochyta foot rot and black stem	Phoma pinodella = Ascochyta pinodella
Ascochyta leaf and pod spot	Ascochyta pisi
Black leaf	Fusicladium pisicola
Cercospora leaf spot	Cercospora pisa-sativae
Cladosporium blight	Cladosporium cladosporioides f.sp. pisicola = Cladosporium pisicola
Damping off, seed rot	Pythium spp.
Downy mildew	Peronospora viciae
Fusarium root rot	Fusarium solani f.sp. pisi
Gray mold	Botrytis cinerea Botryotinia fuckeliana [teleomorph]
Near wilt	Fusarium oxysporum f.sp. pisi Race 2
Powdery mildew	Erysiphe pisi
Pythium root rot and root tip necrosis	Pythium spp.
Rhizoctonia seedling rot	Rhizoctonia solani (AG-4); Thanatephorus cucumeris [teleomorph]
Rust	Uromyces fabae
Sclerotinia rot = white mold	Sclerotinia sclerotiorum
Septoria blotch	Septoria pisi
Thielaviopsis root rot – black root rot	Thielaviopsis basicola Chalara elegans [synanamorph]
Wilt	Fusarium oxysporum f.sp. pisi Race 1, Race 5, Race 6

== Nematodes, parasitic ==
Nematodes, parasitic
C nematode	Heterodera goettingiana
Lesion nematode	Pratylenchus spp.
Root-knot nematode	Meloidogyne incognita

== Viral diseases ==
Viral diseases
Cucumber mosaic virus	genus Cucumovirus, Cucumber mosaic virus (CMV)
Pea early browning virus	genus Tobravirus, Pea early browning virus (PEBV)
Pea enation mosaic	obligate symbiosis of an enamovirus and an umbravirus, Pea enation mosaic virus (PEMV)
Pea leaf roll	genus Luteovirus, Bean leaf roll virus (BLRV)
Pea mosaic	genus Potyvirus, Bean yellow mosaic virus (BYMV) genus Comovirus, Pea mild mosaic virus (PmiMV)
Pea seedborne mosaic	genus Potyvirus, Pea seed-borne mosaic virus (PSbMV)
Pea streak	genus Alfamovirus, Alfalfa mosaic virus (AMV)
Western pea streak virus	genus Carlavirus, Pea streak virus (PeSV) (= Wisconsin pea streak virus)
Pea stunt	genus Carlavirus, Red clover vein mosaic virus (RCVMV)
