= Grapevine Pinot gris virus =

Virus classification
- (unranked): Virus
- Realm: Riboviria
- Kingdom: Orthornavirae
- Phylum: Kitrinoviricota
- Class: Alsuviricetes
- Order: Tymovirales
- Family: Betaflexiviridae
- Genus: Trichovirus
- Species: Trichovirus pinovitis

Species of virus

Grapevine Pinot gris virus (GPGV) is a positive sense single-stranded RNA virus in the genus Trichovirus. It affects the growth of grapevine plants' leaves and fruit, and is similar to grapevine berry inner-necrosis virus.

== History ==
Trentino Alto Adige shown in red.

Vineyards in northwest Italy began noticing symptoms of GPGV in 2003. The first two vineyards affected were Piana Rotaliana and Collio in Trentino Alto Adige. From there the virus spread to vineyards throughout Trentino Alto Adige and Friuli Venezia Giulia, then Emilia Romagna and Veneto. The virus was first identified on Pinot gris grapevines, hence the name, but soon spread to other varieties. In 2011, Annalisa Giampetruzzi et al. published an article in the journal Virus Research officially identifying and naming the virus. Giampetruzzi and her colleagues used deep sequencing to find similarities to other viruses, and found stretches of viral RNA genome that corresponded to sequences found in the RNA genomes of both Grapevine Berry Inner Necrosis Virus (GINV) and Grapevine Rupestris Stem Pitting-associated Virus (GRSPaV). Smaller percentages of other viral genomes were also found. Because its complete genomic sequence could not be found in the NCBI Reference Sequence Database, the genome was considered completely novel, and the virus officially named Grapevine Pinot gris virus. The virus was recognized by the National Plant Protection Agency of Italy in February 2014, and ProMEDMail published the first account of its existence. After its arrival to different areas of Italy, the virus was found to be spreading across Europe, being found in Czechia and Slovakia in December 2014. In November 2015, the virus was identified in California, and in April 2016 it was found in Chinese vineyards in the Liaoning, Beijing, and Zhejiang provinces. The most recent outbreak of the virus occurred in Australia in August 2017.

== Classification ==
GPGV is a positive single-stranded RNA virus, meaning that the genome of the virus is made up of RNA nucleotides. While Giampetruzzi and her colleagues found the genome to have similarities to the marafiviruses Grapevine Syrah virus-1 and Grapevine Rupestris vein feathering virus, it was found to be more similar to the Trichovirus genus. Besides GINV, other Trichoviruses include Apple chlorotic leaf spot virus, Apricot pseudo-chlorotic leaf spot virus, Cherry mottle leaf virus, and peach mosaic virus.

== Genome structure ==
Giampetruzzi et al. originally reported a complete consensus sequence of 7258 nucleotides (excluding the polyA tail), which makes up three overlapping reading frames (ORFs). Each ORF's length in base pairs, weight in kilodaltons, and the proteins/enzymes for which it codes are in the table below. The sequence then proceeds with an untranslated region of 82 base pairs and terminates in the polyA tail that is typical of viral genomes.

	Length	Weight	Enzymes	Notes
ORF1	1865	214kDa	Replicase-associated proteins, methyltransferase, helicase, and RdRp	Also contains AlkB domain and codes for Fe2+ coordination motifs and residues
ORF2	376	42kDa	Movement proteins homologous to those found in the Apple chlorotic leaf spot virus	
ORF3	195	22kDa	Putative coat protein	

== Symptoms ==
Symptoms are most identifiable in the spring, when new shoots and leaves are beginning to grow. Symptoms of GPGV include chlorotic mottling of the leaves, leaf deformation, stunted growth, low quality fruit, abnormal branching, and reduced yield. The most common symptoms are the mottling and deformation of the leaves. Other symptoms that have been noted are bud bursting delays, shortened internodes, and more acidic berries. It is also important to note that symptoms might not even be evident in infected plants.

== Replication cycle ==
The replication cycle of this virus is not currently known. Possible reservoirs may include insects, mites, or nematodes. Based on the more-recent discovery of the virus, not much research has been done on this aspect.

=== Spread of the virus ===
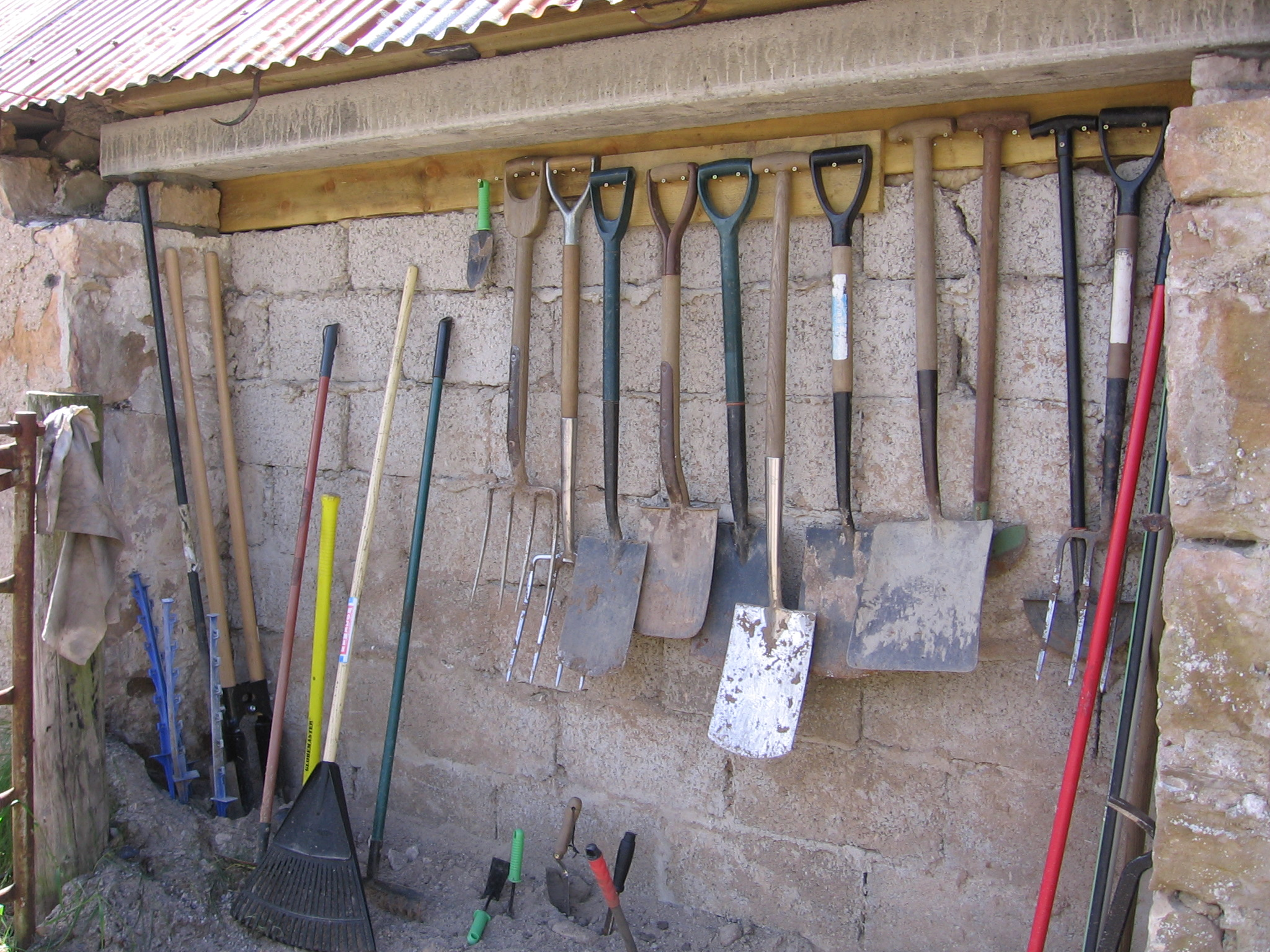

It is commonly accepted that this virus is spread by infected propagation machinery, materials, and tools, and possibly by the trading of propagated stems between vineyards.
