= Grapevine virus A =

Virus classification
- (unranked): Virus
- Realm: Riboviria
- Kingdom: Orthornavirae
- Phylum: Kitrinoviricota
- Class: Alsuviricetes
- Order: Tymovirales
- Family: Betaflexiviridae
- Genus: Vitivirus
- Species: Vitivirus alphavitis

Species of virus

Grapevine virus A (GVA) is a moderately common genetic virus that affects Vitis vinifera and American Vitis grapevine species throughout the world and can be fatal if not treated. Grapevine virus A is in the family Betaflexiviridae and genus Vitivirus. The common name for this virus is grapevine closterovirus. Common symptoms in infected grapevines include stem pitting (when the outer layer of the stems of the grapevine to peel off). Although there is a treatment available to cure infected grapevines, it is not one hundred percent effective, so preventative measures are the best solution to the virus. Every inhabited continent on the globe has had breakouts of grapevine closterovirus due to the complex genetic makeup of the virus. Grapevine virus A has a single-stranded RNA genome, which is similar to that of Grapevine virus B. There are multiple strains of the virus that vary both molecularly and biologically which account for the slightly different symptoms exhibited by infected plants.

== Symptoms ==
Grapevines infected with Grapevine virus A may not show symptoms for up to two years. There are several common symptoms of GVA, and both fall under the Rugose wood category, which is an umbrella term for the many diseases that can cause problems in the bark of grapevines.

=== Stem-pitting ===
Stem-pitting causes the outer layer of the stems of the grapevine to peel off so the inner, more vulnerable part of the stem is exposed to the atmosphere. Stem-pitting can also cause poor or slowed down growth and can decrease the yield of grapes by up to 50%. Stem-pitting gets its name from the presence of small pits visible on the inside of the stems once the bark peels off.

=== Kober Stem Grooving ===
Kober stem grooving is specific to grapevines, and no other plants can be infected with it. Kober stem grooving gets its name because the variety of grapevine that has visible effects of Kober stem grooving is the Kober 5BB (a variety of grapevine). Kober stem grooving causes grooves to form on the thin stems of the grapevine which can cause stunted growth and makes it easier for bugs to eat at the insides of the grapevine. The LN33 and Vitis rupestris varieties of grapes do not show symptoms of Kober stem grooving, but can still be infected with it. However, these varieties will show signs of the other symptoms.

== Diagnosis ==
If a grapevine is experiencing any of these symptoms, there are a few common methods grape farmers use to detect if Grapevine virus A is present in grapes, described hereafter.

=== Immunosorbent Electron Microscopy ===
Immunosorbent electron microscopy (ISEM) is the most commonly used detection method. ISEM is a process where tissue is extracted from the plant and placed onto an electron microscope grid that is covered in antiserum (a type of serum containing antibodies). If the grapevine is infected with GVA, antibody particles will form around the extracted tissue. ISEM is very reliable, and there are usually no false negatives or false positives.

=== Double Antibody Sandwich-Enzyme-Linked Immunosorbent Assay ===
Another common way used to detect GVA is double antibody sandwich-enzyme-linked immunosorbent assay (DAS-ELISA/ELISA) with polyclonal antisera and monoclonal antibodies. Polyclonal antisera is serum that contains antibodies secreted by B cell lineages (cells derived from bone marrow). Monoclonal antibodies are man-made proteins produced by cloning a singular cell. This method is able to detect the isotopes in grapevines that have the virus. A sample of the infected grapevine is taken and placed on a microscope grid that has polyclonal antisera and monoclonal antibodies. A computer records the isotopes in the sample, and then the isotopes are compared with the isotopes of a healthy grape plant.

=== Indirect ELISA and the Western Blotting Technique ===
Indirect ELISA and the western blotting technique are also used, but these techniques are not commonly used. During indirect ELISA two antibodies are used. The primary antibody is combined with a sample of the infected grapevine and it is then combined with a secondary antibody. These two antibodies react and the reaction is then analyzed for signs of GVA. This method is not as reliable as the other methods because when the secondary antibody is added it is not always clear if the two antibodies are reacting because the grapevine is infected or if there is some other reason. Similar to indirect ELISA, the western blotting technique also uses two antibodies. The western blotting technique is used to identify if the suspected grapevine plant has the specific proteins present only in infected grapevines. To use this technique, first a small piece of tissue is taken off the grapevine. Cold phosphate buffered saline (PBS) is then rubbed onto the tissue. Cold phosphate buffered saline is a solution that prevents the cell walls from rupturing or getting damaged. Next, a cell scraper is used to separate the cells, and the cells are analyzed to see if they contain the protein commonly present in grapevines infected with GVA. Nucleic acid hybridizationis also used to detect GVA. In this method, a small sample of the infected plant is taken and then heated. Since GVA is a disease that affects the RNA of the plant, new RNA is added to the sample and it combines with the infected RNA. This method helps scientists isolate sequences of the RNA strand so they can analyze the sequence that typically contains the disease and see if the plant is infected.

== Transmission ==
Grapevine virus A is transmitted through propagation (the breeding of different grapevine varieties) and grafting (joining different plant tissues together so they can continue to grow as one plant). Since Grapevine virus A is a genetic virus, the only way it can spread is if DNA from infected grape plants gets mixed in with the DNA of healthy grapevines. Since this can only be done by breeding and grafting, GVA can not be transferred by touch. This means if an infected plant is close to a healthy plant, the leaves touching will not transmit the virus. Another way the disease is transmitted is through mealybug and scale insects. Some common species of mealybugs found on grapevines are the long tailed mealybug (Pseudococcus longispinus) and the obscure mealybug (Pseudococcus viburni). When a mealybug feeds on an infected grapevine for at least fifteen minutes, they can spread the disease by feeding on healthy grapevines. The disease remains in their system for 48 hours or until they molt (shed).

== Prevention ==
Preventing the virus from spreading is the best way to ensure virus free plants. Grapevine virus A is transmitted through propagation (the breeding of different grapevine varieties) and grafting (joining different plant tissues together so they can continue to grow as one plant). Since Grapevine virus A is a genetic virus, the only way it can spread is if DNA from infected grape plants gets mixed in with the DNA of healthy grapevines. Since this can only be done by breeding and grafting, GVA can not be transferred by touch. This means if an infected plant is close to a healthy plant, the leaves touching will not transmit the virus. Another way the disease is transmitted is through mealybug and scale insects. Some common species of mealybugs found on grapevines are the long tailed mealybug(Pseudococcus longispinus) and the obscure mealybug (Pseudococcus viburni). When a mealybug feeds on an infected grapevine for at least fifteen minutes, they can spread the disease by feeding on healthy grapevines. The disease remains in their system for 48 hours or until they molt (shed). Vector control is the most commonly used way to prevent the spread of GVA. Vector control uses methods to eradicate the pests that transmit GVA. One form of vector control is to use pesticides to kill the mealybugs and scale insects that transmit the disease. However, this way is not preferred because the continual use of pesticides will help the pests build up a genetic resistance (tolerance to survive in conditions that would normally be lethal) to pesticides, and the pesticides will no longer work. It is also important not to spread the disease to countries that do not have GVA infecting their grapevines already. In order to do this, grapevine plants that are being transferred internationally should be certified virus-free stocks. So far, scientists have not been able to genetically modify a grapevine that is immune to GVA. However, they are still working to see if this is possible.

== Treatment ==
There is no treatment available that kills Grapevine virus 100% of the time. However, the cryopreservation (a process in which living cells and tissues are preserved by freezing them in very low temperatures) of vitro-grown shoot tips is a method that has been recently developed and is effective 97% of the time. Cryopreservation uses liquid nitrogen to freeze the shoot tips (plant tissues where the new bud comes through) of the grapevines, and this process is highly effective at eradicating GVA. Originally when developing this method scientists thought that shoot tips needed to be dehydrated before being frozen in order to treat GVA. However, after analyzing what percent of plants still were infected after the dehydration stage, it was found that the only method getting rid of GVA was the freezing method. Unfortunately, if the meristem (the region of plant tissue near the shoot tips that facilitates cell division) of the grapevine is too small, the freezing process can kill the grapevine. If the meristem of the grapevine is less than 0.1mm, the freezing process kills the plant. If the meristem is 0.2 to 0.4mm, the grapevine is able to completely regenerate after being frozen, but Grapevine virus A is not eliminated. If the meristem is 0.5-2.0mm, the freezing process is highly effective in getting rid of GVA and the plant completely recovers from being frozen. Currently, this is the only widely used process of eradicating GVA, but scientists are looking to find more methods to cure grapevines of Grapevine virus A.

== Countries Most Heavily Impacted By Grapevine virus A ==
- United States of America (California and Missouri)
- Brazil (São Paulo)
- Chile
- France
- Italy (Sardinia)
- Portugal
- Spain
- South Africa
- South Australia
- Victoria

== Nucleotide Sequence and Genome Organization ==
When the nucleotide of Grapevine virus A was sequenced it was found that the virus has a single stranded RNA genome with around 7800 nucleotides. Further research showed that there are five open reading frames (ORF). Open reading frames are the part of the genome that can be read. A reading frame begins with a start codon (codon that begins the translation to RNA from the DNA strand) and ends with a stop codon (codon that ends the translation to RNA from the DNA strand). The first ORF codes for a 194 kDa polypeptide with conserved motifs of replication related proteins of positive strand RNA viruses. This part of the genome codes for the replication of the virus and is what helps the virus stay alive in the grapevine. The second ORD codes for a 19 kDa polypeptide and is not very similar to any other protein sequences found on any databases. The second ORF is very similar to one of the ORFs in Grapevine virus B. Therefore, the first ORF is what makes Grapevine virus A unique. The third ORF codes for putative movement protein. This protein ensures efficient cell to cell propagation (producing seeds). The fourth ORF codes for capsid protein (the hard shell that encases the genetic material). This hard shelled capsid protein is similar to the shell of an egg where the yolk is what encases the genetic material. The fifth ORF codes for nucleic-acid binding protein. This is the protein that helps the DNA or RNA connect with amino acids. Even further research of the genomes of GVA traced Grapevine virus A back to Apple chlorotic leaf spot virus. When the DNA of Apple chlorotic leaf spot virus was replicated there were mistakes, also known as mutations, made. The mutations created a new virus that was so different from the original virus, and this new virus eventually got the name Grapevine virus A.

== Genetic Variants ==
There are eight different isolates of Grapevine virus A. The different isolates induce slightly different symptoms. Scientists have grouped the isolates into three different groups. Within each group, the genomes share 91.0-99.8% of the same sequence identity, and the three groups share 78.0-89.3% of the same sequence identity between each other. Group III is the most different from the other groups and only shares 78.0-79.6% sequence identity with the other groups. The symptom of GVA that was the most different in each group was the vein clearing (when the plant loses the color in its veins). The grapevines infected with the Group I strain of GVA only show mild signs of vein clearing while the other groups show more intense signs of this. Each group varies in the intensity of vein clearing present.

== See also ==
- List of viruses
- Genetically Modified Grapevines and DNA
- Grapevine virus B
- Grapevine varieties
- Grapevine leafroll-associated virus
