= Leek yellow stripe virus =

Virus classification
- (unranked): Virus
- Realm: Riboviria
- Kingdom: Orthornavirae
- Phylum: Pisuviricota
- Class: Stelpaviricetes
- Order: Patatavirales
- Family: Potyviridae
- Genus: Potyvirus
- Species: Potyvirus ampeloprasi

Potyvirus

Leek yellow stripe virus (LYSV) is a plant virus] in the genus Potyvirus. It was first detected in leek but also infects garlic and onion worldwide. Economically less important Allium spp., such as Allium angulosum, Allium caeruleum, Allium cyathophorum, Allium nutans, Allium scorodoprasum, Allium senescens subsp. montanum were also found to harbor the virus.

== Epidemiology ==
LYSV causes typical yellow stripe symptom on leek. A yield reduction of up to 54% on garlic has been reported. The virus is transmitted in non-persistent manner by Aphis fabae and Myzus persicae but not by seeds.

== Genome ==
Its ssRNA genome has one large open reading frame (ORF) that encodes a polyprotein of ca. 10,131 nt and 3,152 amino acids, excluding the poly-(A) tail. LYSV can be separated into three major types: S, L, and N based on variation in the P1 and coat protein (CP) regions of its genome and plant host species. Types-S and N isolates are mostly infecting garlic while type-L is infecting leek.

== Control ==
Several researches had been conducted to determine resistant or tolerant Allium spp. cultivars, as an epidemiological method to control LYSV. Three French garlic cultivars were tested against the virus, with result Messidrome had the least severe bulb weight loss (17%) compared to Germidour (26%) and Printanor (54%). Another study in French found that a fertile garlic clone (clone 211) was highly resistant to LYSV infection. All 87 samples of Vekan variety collected during field surveys in Czech Republic were tested to be LYSV-free, which highly indicated its resistance to the virus. Recently, Şampiyon and Perama were found to have the best reactions (most tolerant) among 15 onion cultivars tested in Turkey to mechanical inoculation of LYSV under greenhouse conditions.
