= Nerine latent virus =

Virus classification
- (unranked): Virus
- Realm: Riboviria
- Kingdom: Orthornavirae
- Phylum: Kitrinoviricota
- Class: Alsuviricetes
- Order: Tymovirales
- Family: Betaflexiviridae
- Genus: Carlavirus
- Species: Carlavirus latensnerinis

Synonyms
- Narcissus symptomless virus

Species of virus

Nerine latent virus (NeLV) is a plant pathogenic virus. It infects Nerine, Narcissus, Hippeastrum and Ismene plants.

== Taxonomy ==
NeLV was first described in 1972. In 2004 it was placed in the Carlavirus genus within the family Flexiviridae. When that family was split in 2009, Carlavirus and NeLV were placed in the family Betaflexiviridae.

=== Narcissus symptomless virus ===
Narcissus symptomless virus was described as a separate virus taxon in 2006. Subsequently, in 2016 it became apparent that the nucleotide sequence identities between Narcissus symptomless virus and the partial genome sequences of Nerine latent virus are 94-97% for coat protein and replicase, well above the threshold 72% set for speciation of flexiviruses. Consequently, these two viruses can be considered to be the same taxon, and since NeLV has priority, Narcissus symptomless virus should be reduced to a synonym.

== Bibliography ==
- Maat DZ, Huttinga H, Hakkaart FA (1978) Nerine latent virus, some properties and serological detectability in Nerine bowdenii. Neth J Plant Pathol 84:47–59
