= Apple stem pitting virus =

Virus classification
- (unranked): Virus
- Realm: Riboviria
- Kingdom: Orthornavirae
- Phylum: Kitrinoviricota
- Class: Alsuviricetes
- Order: Tymovirales
- Family: Betaflexiviridae
- Genus: Foveavirus
- Species: Foveavirus mali

Synonyms
- apple spy 227 epinasty and decline virus hawthorn ring pattern mosaic virus pear necrotic spot virus pear stony pit virus pear vein yellows virus

Species of virus

Apple stem pitting virus (ASPV) is a plant pathogenic virus of the family Betaflexiviridae. A number of hosts are in the genus Malus (apples).
