= Apple stem grooving virus =

Virus classification
- (unranked): Virus
- Realm: Riboviria
- Kingdom: Orthornavirae
- Phylum: Kitrinoviricota
- Class: Alsuviricetes
- Order: Tymovirales
- Family: Betaflexiviridae
- Genus: Capillovirus
- Species: Capillovirus mali

Synonyms
- Virginia Crab stem grooving virus Chenopodium dark green epinasty virus Brown line disease virus

Species of virus

Apple stem grooving virus is a plant pathogenic virus of the family Betaflexiviridae.
