= Narcissus common latent virus =

Virus classification
- (unranked): Virus
- Realm: Riboviria
- Kingdom: Orthornavirae
- Phylum: Kitrinoviricota
- Class: Alsuviricetes
- Order: Tymovirales
- Family: Betaflexiviridae
- Genus: Carlavirus
- Species: Carlavirus latensnarcissi

Synonyms
- Narcissus mottling-associated virus

Species of virus

Narcissus common latent virus (NCLV) is a plant pathogenic virus. It infects Narcissus plants. The term 'latent' refers to the fact that infection may be symptomless. Transmission occurs by Aphids.

== Taxonomy ==
This Carlavirus should not be confused with the similarly named Narcissus latent virus which is a Macluravirus, and is sometimes incorrectly referred to by the latter name.

== Bibliography ==
- Zheng, HY; Chen, J; Adams, MJ; Chen, JP (August 2006). "Complete nucleotide sequence and affinities of the genomic RNA of Narcissus common latent virus (genus Carlavirus)". Archives of Virology. 151 (8): 1667–72. doi:10.1007/s00705-006-0727-x. PMID 16489505. S2CID 20991505.
- BRUNT, A. A. (December 1977). "Some hosts and properties of narcissus latent virus, a carlavirus commonly infecting narcissus and bulbous iris". Annals of Applied Biology. 87 (3): 355–364. doi:10.1111/j.1744-7348.1977.tb01900.x.
- Martelli, Giovanni P.; Saldarelli, Pasquale (2012). "Carlavirus". In Tidona, Christian; Gholamreza, Darai (eds.). The Springer index of viruses (2 ed.). New York, NY: Springer. pp. 521–532. ISBN 978-0387959191.
