= Potato latent virus =

Virus classification
- (unranked): Virus
- Realm: Riboviria
- Kingdom: Orthornavirae
- Phylum: Kitrinoviricota
- Class: Alsuviricetes
- Order: Tymovirales
- Family: Betaflexiviridae
- Genus: Carlavirus
- Species: Carlavirus latensolani

Species of virus

Potato latent virus (PotLV) is a plant pathogenic virus from the family Betaflexiviridae that infects potatoes. It was first found and identified infecting Red La Soda potatoes from the United States.
