= Strawberry pseudo mild yellow-edge virus =

Virus classification
- (unranked): Virus
- Realm: Riboviria
- Kingdom: Orthornavirae
- Phylum: Kitrinoviricota
- Class: Alsuviricetes
- Order: Tymovirales
- Family: Betaflexiviridae
- Genus: Carlavirus
- Species: Carlavirus fragariae

Species of virus

Strawberry pseudo mild yellow-edge virus (SPMYEV) is a pathogenic plant virus.

== See also ==
- List of strawberry diseases
