= Carnation latent virus =

Virus classification
- (unranked): Virus
- Realm: Riboviria
- Kingdom: Orthornavirae
- Phylum: Kitrinoviricota
- Class: Alsuviricetes
- Order: Tymovirales
- Family: Betaflexiviridae
- Genus: Carlavirus
- Species: Carlavirus latensdianthi

Synonyms
- Dulcamara A virus; Dulcamara B virus

Species of virus

Carnation latent virus (CLV) is a plant pathogenic virus of the family Betaflexiviridae.
