= Grapevine virus D =

Virus classification
- (unranked): Virus
- Realm: Riboviria
- Kingdom: Orthornavirae
- Phylum: Kitrinoviricota
- Class: Alsuviricetes
- Order: Tymovirales
- Family: Betaflexiviridae
- Genus: Vitivirus
- Species: Vitivirus deltavitis

Species of virus

Grapevine virus D (GVD) is a plant virus species in the genus Vitivirus, associated with rugose wood condition of grapevine.

== See also ==
- List of viruses
