= Hop mosaic virus =

Virus classification
- (unranked): Virus
- Realm: Riboviria
- Kingdom: Orthornavirae
- Phylum: Kitrinoviricota
- Class: Alsuviricetes
- Order: Tymovirales
- Family: Betaflexiviridae
- Genus: Carlavirus
- Species: Carlavirus humuli

Species of virus

Hop mosaic virus (HpMV) is a pathogenic plant virus.
