= American hop latent virus =

Virus classification
- (unranked): Virus
- Realm: Riboviria
- Kingdom: Orthornavirae
- Phylum: Kitrinoviricota
- Class: Alsuviricetes
- Order: Tymovirales
- Family: Betaflexiviridae
- Genus: Carlavirus
- Species: Carlavirus americanense

Synonyms
- Hop American latent virus; New Zealand hop virus

Species of virus

American hop latent virus (AHLV) is a plant pathogenic virus of the family Betaflexiviridae. The virus was one of several carlaviruses first detected in 1980 in commercial hops growing in North America, though it was not isolated until later. In one early study, AHLV was found to reduce hop cone yield by 14% and affect the height and width of the plant. It appears to be primarily spread by the damson hop aphid.

Its genome is about 8,600 nucleotides in length with a 3'-polyadenylate tail that contains a total of six open reading frames.
