= Helenium virus S =

Virus classification
- (unranked): Virus
- Realm: Riboviria
- Kingdom: Orthornavirae
- Phylum: Kitrinoviricota
- Class: Alsuviricetes
- Order: Tymovirales
- Family: Betaflexiviridae
- Genus: Carlavirus
- Species: Carlavirus sigmahelenii

Synonyms
- Helenium S virus

Species of virus

Helenium virus S (HVS) is a plant pathogenic virus.
