= Daphne virus S =

Virus classification
- (unranked): Virus
- Realm: Riboviria
- Kingdom: Orthornavirae
- Phylum: Kitrinoviricota
- Class: Alsuviricetes
- Order: Tymovirales
- Family: Betaflexiviridae
- Genus: Carlavirus
- Species: Carlavirus sigmadaphnis

Species of virus

Daphne virus S (DVS) is a plant virus that infects daphnes. Infection causes leaf distortion and chlorotic spot disease symptoms. Its genome is about 8,700 nucleotides in length and contains six open reading frames that encode for a viral replicase, a triple gene block and capsid proteins.
