= Flexiviridae =

Former family of RNA plant viruses

Flexiviridae was a family of viruses named after being filamentous and highly flexible. Members of the family infect plants. In 2009, the family was dissolved and replaced with four families, each of which still contain the name flexiviridae:

- Alphaflexiviridae
- Betaflexiviridae
- Gammaflexiviridae
- Deltaflexiviridae

Flexiviridae was incertae sedis but the new families are in Tymovirales.
