= Grapevine virus B =

Virus classification
- (unranked): Virus
- Realm: Riboviria
- Kingdom: Orthornavirae
- Phylum: Kitrinoviricota
- Class: Alsuviricetes
- Order: Tymovirales
- Family: Betaflexiviridae
- Genus: Vitivirus
- Species: Vitivirus betavitis

Species of virus

Grapevine virus B is plant virus species in the genus Vitivirus. It is associated with rugose wood (corky bark) symptoms in grapevine.

== See also ==
- List of viruses
- List of grape diseases
