= Cherry mottle leaf virus =

Virus classification
- (unranked): Virus
- Realm: Riboviria
- Kingdom: Orthornavirae
- Phylum: Kitrinoviricota
- Class: Alsuviricetes
- Order: Tymovirales
- Family: Betaflexiviridae
- Genus: Trichovirus
- Species: Trichovirus maculavii

Synonyms
- Cerasuvirus maculans virus; Marmor cerasae virus; Marmor cerasi virus; Prunivir cerasi virus; Prunus virus 1

Species of virus

Cherry mottle leaf virus (CMLV) is a plant pathogenic virus causing leaf rot. It is closely related to the peach mosaic virus.

== Host and Symptoms ==
Cherry mottle leaf virus (CMLV) has a wide range of hosts. It infects the genus Prunus including cherry (Prunus avium) and peach (P. persica) trees. More specifically, CMLV infects both sweet and bitter/wild type (P. emarginata) cherry trees. The most common propagation host is the Chenopodium quinoa and the most common infected trees in the field are Bing and Napoleon trees. CMLV can be transmitted by budding and grafting with infected budwood from infected bitter cherry trees or symptomless peach trees. Not all diseased hosts show symptoms which can make diagnoses challenging. When symptoms are observed, they are mostly found on the leaves themselves. Leaves can be mottled with yellow and green chlorotic patterns between the veins. Other leaf symptoms include leaf distortion and puckering of the younger leaves. The fruit that are produced can be small, flavorless and ripen later in the season. In general, affected trees may appear stunted.

== Management ==
It is common to treat CMLV by using virus free budwood in certified nursery stocks. It is important to remove all bitter cherry trees in the orchard and any trees that show symptoms. This is a cultural practice that includes removing all fallen infected leaves from the ground which will prevent any future disease spread within the cycle. Other non chemical management practices include planting verified virus free stocks and avoiding grafting or budding with infected wood. Removing wild type cherry trees that are either surrounding or inside of the orchard is another great option. Typically, no chemical management practices are recommended.

== Environment ==
The environment impacts the spread of CMLV. This virus can be transmitted by a bud mite known as Eriophyes inaequalis. The seasons affect disease development as premature dropping of the leaves is common in the fall and the green/yellow mottling is less noticeable later in the growing season. In general, warmer temperatures suppress disease development. In terms of placement, bitter trees located at foothills in California are at higher risk of infection.

== See also ==
- Cherry
- Virus
