= Capillovirus =

Virus classification
- (unranked): Virus
- Realm: Riboviria
- Kingdom: Orthornavirae
- Phylum: Kitrinoviricota
- Class: Alsuviricetes
- Order: Tymovirales
- Family: Betaflexiviridae
- Subfamily: Trivirinae
- Genus: Capillovirus

Genus of viruses

Capillovirus is a genus of viruses in the order Tymovirales, in the family Betaflexiviridae. Plants, pome fruits, citrus, and pear serve as natural hosts. There are nine species in this genus. Diseases associated with this genus include: abnormal graft union, possibly black necrotic leaf spot disease.

== Taxonomy ==
The following species are assigned to the genus, listed by scientific name and followed by the exemplar virus of the species:

- Capillovirus alphaeriobotryae, Loquat virus A
- Capillovirus alphagerberae, Gerbera capillovirus A
- Capillovirus alphamume, Mume virus A
- Capillovirus alpharibis, Currant virus A
- Capillovirus alphavii, Cherry virus A
- Capillovirus mali, Apple stem grooving virus
- Capillovirus paris, Paris polyphylla severe chlorotic mottle virus
- Capillovirus uniheveae, Rubber tree virus 1
- Capillovirus unipolysciasii, Polyscias capillovirus 1

== Structure ==
Viruses in Capillovirus are non-enveloped, with flexuous and filamentous geometries. The diameter is around 12 nm, with a length of 640 nm. Genomes are linear, around 6.5-7.5kb in length. The genome codes for 3 proteins.

| Genus | Structure | Symmetry | Capsid | Genomic arrangement | Genomic segmentation |
|---|---|---|---|---|---|
| Capillovirus | Filamentous | | Non-enveloped | Linear | Monopartite |

== Life cycle ==
Viral replication is cytoplasmic. Entry into the host cell is achieved by penetration into the host cell. Replication follows the positive stranded RNA virus replication model. Positive stranded rna virus transcription is the method of transcription. The virus exits the host cell by tubule-guided viral movement. Plants, pome fruits, citrus, and pear serve as the natural host. The virus is transmitted via a vector (by seeds and no known). Transmission routes are vector, mechanical, and seed borne.

| Genus | Host details | Tissue tropism | Entry details | Release details | Replication site | Assembly site | Transmission |
|---|---|---|---|---|---|---|---|
| Capillovirus | Pome fruits; citrus; pear | None | Viral movement; mechanical inoculation | Viral movement | Cytoplasm | Cytoplasm | Mechanical: seeds |
