= GVF =

GVF may refer to:

- Greta Van Fleet, an American rock band
- Global Village Foundation, an American charity
- Golin language, native to Papua New Guinea
- Grapevine virus F, a plant virus species in the genus Vitivirus
- Gradient vector flow, a computer vision method
