= Foveavirus =

Virus classification
- (unranked): Virus
- Realm: Riboviria
- Kingdom: Orthornavirae
- Phylum: Kitrinoviricota
- Class: Alsuviricetes
- Order: Tymovirales
- Family: Betaflexiviridae
- Subfamily: Quinvirinae
- Genus: Foveavirus

Genus of viruses

Foveavirus is a genus of viruses in the order Tymovirales, in the family Betaflexiviridae. Plants serve as natural hosts. There are 13 species in this genus. Diseases associated with this genus include: mosaic and ringspot symptoms.

== Taxonomy ==
The following species are assigned to the genus, listed by scientific name and followed by the exemplar virus of the species:

- Foveavirus alphavitis, Grapevine foveavirus A
- Foveavirus betavii, Cherry virus B
- Foveavirus duoasiaticum, Asian prunus virus 2
- Foveavirus latensarmeniacae, Apricot latent virus
- Foveavirus mali, Apple stem pitting virus
- Foveavirus mumeae, Prunus mume chlorotic leaf curl-associated virus
- Foveavirus persicae, Peach chlorotic mottle virus
- Foveavirus rupestris, Grapevine rupestris stem pitting-associated virus
- Foveavirus tafvitis, Grapevine virus T
- Foveavirus tetracamelliae, Camellia ringspot associated virus 4
- Foveavirus unasiaticum, Asian prunus virus 1
- Foveavirus unicanadense, Rubus canadensis virus 1
- Foveavirus unirubi, Rubus virus 1

== Structure ==
Viruses in Foveavirus are non-enveloped, with flexuous and filamentous geometries. The diameter is around 12-13 nm. Genomes are linear, around 8.4-9.3kb in length. The genome codes for 5 proteins.

Genus	Structure	Symmetry	Capsid	Genomic arrangement	Genomic segmentation
Foveavirus	Filamentous		Non-enveloped	Linear	Monopartite

== Life cycle ==
Viral replication is cytoplasmic, and is lysogenic. Entry into the host cell is achieved by penetration into the host cell. Replication follows the positive stranded RNA virus replication model. Positive stranded RNA virus transcription is the method of transcription. The virus exits the host cell by tripartite non-tubule guided viral movement. Plants serve as the natural host. Transmission routes are grafting.

Genus	Host details	Tissue tropism	Entry details	Release details	Replication site	Assembly site	Transmission
Foveavirus	Plants	None	Viral movement; mechanical inoculation	Viral movement	Cytoplasm	Cytoplasm	Grafting

== History ==
Foveavirus was accepted as a genus in 1998. In 2004, it was assigned to the family Flexiviridae and reassigned to the family Betaflexiviridae in 2009. Within Betaflexiviridae, Foveavirus was assigned to the subfamily Quinvirinae in 2016.
