= GVE =

GVE may refer to:

- Duwet language, native to New Guinea
- Gardenvale railway station, in Victoria, Australia
- Garve railway station, in Scotland
- General visceral efferent fibers
- Grapevine virus E, a plant virus
