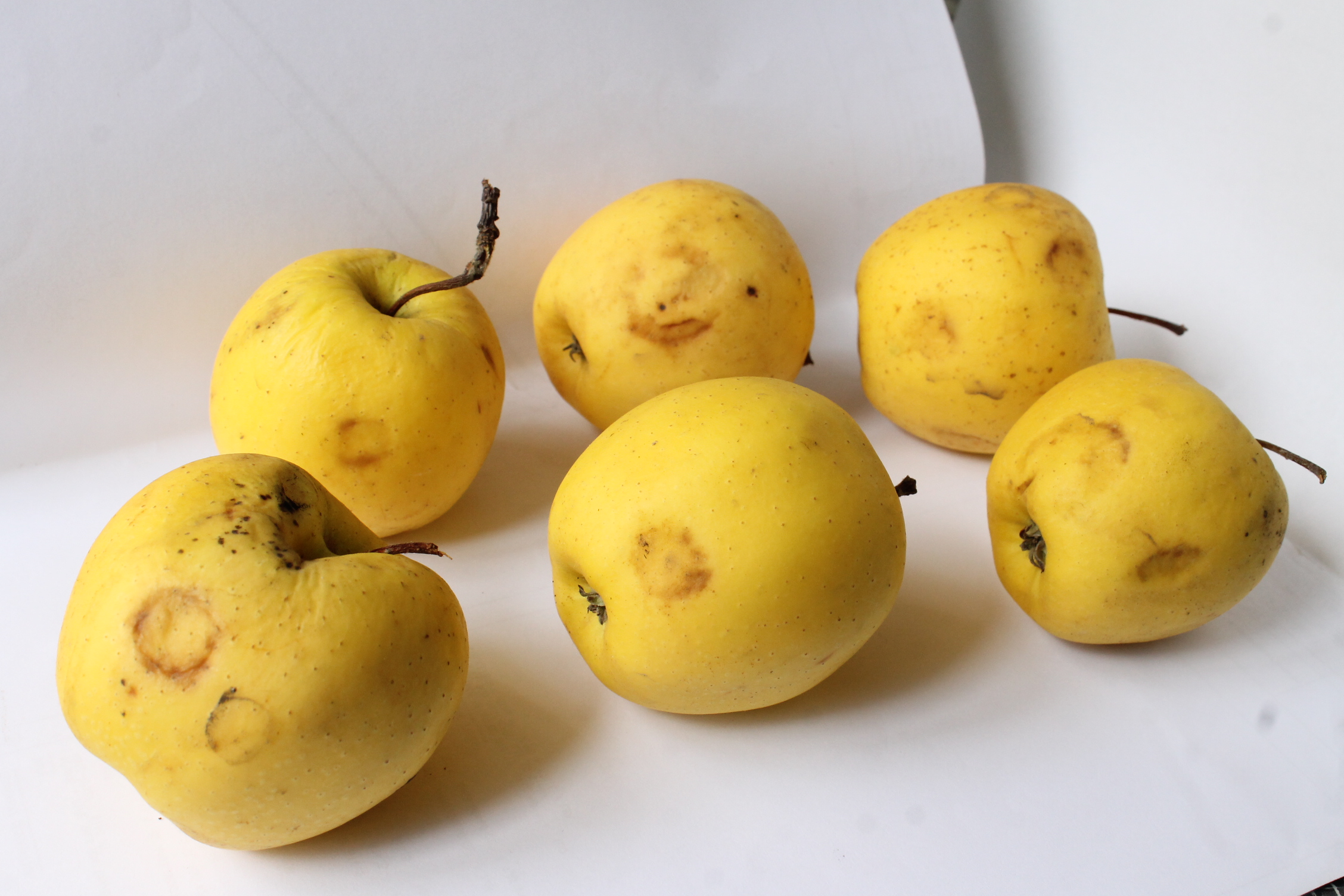
- Apple chlorotic leafspot virus

Virus classification
- (unranked): Virus
- Realm: Riboviria
- Kingdom: Orthornavirae
- Phylum: Kitrinoviricota
- Class: Alsuviricetes
- Order: Tymovirales
- Family: Betaflexiviridae
- Subfamily: Trivirinae
- Genus: Trichovirus

= Trichovirus =

Genus of viruses

Trichovirus is a genus of viruses in the order Tymovirales, in the family Betaflexiviridae. Plants, specifically angiosperms such as pome fruits, citrus, and pear, serve as natural hosts for this plant pathogen. There are ten species in this genus.

== Taxonomy ==
The following species are assigned to the genus, listed by scientific name and followed by the exemplar virus of the species:

- Trichovirus armeniacae, Apricot pseudo-chlorotic leaf spot virus
- Trichovirus chloropersicae, Peach chlorotic leaf spot virus
- Trichovirus latensavii, Cherry latent virus 1
- Trichovirus maculavii, Cherry mottle leaf virus
- Trichovirus mali, Apple chlorotic leaf spot virus
- Trichovirus mipersicae, Peach virus M
- Trichovirus necroacini, Grapevine berry inner necrosis virus
- Trichovirus persicae, Peach mosaic virus
- Trichovirus phlomis, Phlomis mottle virus
- Trichovirus pinovitis, Grapevine Pinot gris virus

== Structure ==
Viruses in Trichovirus are non-enveloped, with flexuous and filamentous geometries. The diameter is around 10-12 nm, with a length of 640-760 nm. Genomes are linear, around 7.5-8.0kb in length. The genome codes for 3 proteins.

Genus	Structure	Symmetry	Capsid	Genomic arrangement	Genomic segmentation
Trichovirus	Filamentous		Non-enveloped	Linear	Monopartite

== Life cycle ==
Viral replication is cytoplasmic. Entry into the host cell is achieved by penetration into the host cell. Replication follows the positive stranded RNA virus replication model. Positive stranded RNA virus transcription is the method of transcription. The virus exits the host cell by tubule-guided viral movement. Plants, pome fruits, citrus, and pear serve as the natural host. Transmission routes are grafting. It is transmitted by mites of the family Eriophyidae, requiring a helper virus for transmission.

Genus	Host details	Tissue tropism	Entry details	Release details	Replication site	Assembly site	Transmission
Trichovirus	Pome fruits; citrus; pear	None	Viral movement; mechanical inoculation	Viral movement	Cytoplasm	Cytoplasm	Grafting; propagating material
