= Mild mottle virus =

Mild mottle virus may refer to:

- Cowpea mild mottle virus
- Pepper mild mottle virus
- Sweet potato mild mottle virus
