= Citrivirus =

Virus classification
- (unranked): Virus
- Realm: Riboviria
- Kingdom: Orthornavirae
- Phylum: Kitrinoviricota
- Class: Alsuviricetes
- Order: Tymovirales
- Family: Betaflexiviridae
- Subfamily: Trivirinae
- Genus: Citrivirus

Genus of viruses

Citrivirus is a genus of viruses in the order Tymovirales, in the family Betaflexiviridae. Plants serve as natural hosts. The genus has three species.

== Taxonomy ==
The genus contains the following species, listed by scientific name and followed by the exemplar virus of the species:

- Citrivirus citri, Citrus leaf blotch virus
- Citrivirus rudbeckiae, Rudbeckia citrivirus A
- Citrivirus unipolysciasii, Polyscias citrivirus 1

== Structure ==
Viruses in Citrivirus are non-enveloped, with flexuous and filamentous geometries. The diameter is around 12 nm, with a length of 960 nm. Genomes are linear, around 8.7kb in length. The genome has 3 open reading frames.

Genus	Structure	Symmetry	Capsid	Genomic arrangement	Genomic segmentation
Citrivirus	Filamentous		Non-enveloped	Linear	Monopartite

== Life cycle ==
Viral replication is cytoplasmic. Entry into the host cell is achieved by penetration into the host cell. Replication follows the positive stranded RNA virus replication model. Positive stranded RNA virus transcription is the method of transcription. Plants serve as the natural host.

Genus	Host details	Tissue tropism	Entry details	Release details	Replication site	Assembly site	Transmission
Citrivirus	Plants	None	Viral movement; mechanical inoculation	Viral movement	Cytoplasm	Cytoplasm	Unknown
