= Red clover vein mosaic virus =

Virus classification
- (unranked): Virus
- Realm: Riboviria
- Kingdom: Orthornavirae
- Phylum: Kitrinoviricota
- Class: Alsuviricetes
- Order: Tymovirales
- Family: Betaflexiviridae
- Genus: Carlavirus
- Species: Carlavirus trifolii

Synonyms
- Pea stunt virus; Vein mosaic virus of red clover

Species of virus

Red clover vein mosaic virus (RCVMV) is a plant pathogenic virus.
