= Vitivirus =

Virus classification
- (unranked): Virus
- Realm: Riboviria
- Kingdom: Orthornavirae
- Phylum: Kitrinoviricota
- Class: Alsuviricetes
- Order: Tymovirales
- Family: Betaflexiviridae
- Subfamily: Trivirinae
- Genus: Vitivirus

Genus of viruses

Vitivirus is a genus of viruses in the order Tymovirales, in the family Betaflexiviridae. Plants serve as natural hosts. There are 22 species in this genus.

== Taxonomy ==
The genus contains the following species, listed by scientific name and followed by the exemplar virus of the species:

- Vitivirus alphactinidiae, Actinidia virus A
- Vitivirus alpharubi, Blackberry virus A
- Vitivirus alphavitis, Grapevine virus A
- Vitivirus ananasae Pineapple vitivirus A
- Vitivirus betactinidiae, Actinidia virus B
- Vitivirus betavitis, Grapevine virus B
- Vitivirus deltavitis, Grapevine virus D
- Vitivirus duomenthae, Mint virus 2
- Vitivirus epsilonvitis, Grapevine virus E
- Vitivirus etavitis, Grapevine virus H
- Vitivirus gammactinidiae, Actinidia virus C
- Vitivirus gammavitis, Grapevine virus G
- Vitivirus iotavitis, Grapevine virus I
- Vitivirus jeivitis, Grapevine virus J
- Vitivirus lambdavitis Grapevine virus L
- Vitivirus latensheraclei, Heracleum latent virus
- Vitivirus muviti, Grapevine virus M
- Vitivirus nuvitis, Grapevine virus N
- Vitivirus phivitis, Grapevine virus F
- Vitivirus rhoviti, Grapevine virus P
- Vitivirus vaccinii, Blueberry green mosaic associated virus
- Vitivirus viarracaciae, Arracacha virus V

== Structure ==
Viruses in Vitivirus are non-enveloped, with flexuous and filamentous geometries. The diameter is around 12 nm. Genomes are linear, around 7.6kb in length. The genome codes for 5 proteins.

| Genus | Structure | Symmetry | Capsid | Genomic arrangement | Genomic segmentation |
|---|---|---|---|---|---|
| Vitivirus | Filamentous | | Non-enveloped | Linear | Monopartite |

== Life cycle ==
Viral replication is cytoplasmic, and is lysogenic. Entry into the host cell is achieved by penetration into the host cell. Replication follows the positive stranded RNA virus replication model. Positive stranded RNA virus transcription is the method of transcription. The virus exits the host cell by tubule-guided viral movement. Plants serve as the natural host. The virus is transmitted via a vector (mechanical inoculation pseudococcid mealybugs and aphids). Transmission routes are vector and mechanical.

| Genus | Host details | Tissue tropism | Entry details | Release details | Replication site | Assembly site | Transmission |
|---|---|---|---|---|---|---|---|
| Vitivirus | Plants | None | Viral movement; mechanical inoculation | Viral movement | Cytoplasm | Cytoplasm | Mechanical inoculation: pseudococcid mealybugs; Mechanical inoculation: aphids |
