= Pea streak virus =

Virus classification
- (unranked): Virus
- Realm: Riboviria
- Kingdom: Orthornavirae
- Phylum: Kitrinoviricota
- Class: Alsuviricetes
- Order: Tymovirales
- Family: Betaflexiviridae
- Genus: Carlavirus
- Species: Carlavirus pisi

Synonyms
- Alfalfa latent virus; Steinklee virus; Wisconsin pea streak virus; probably Pea streak New Zealand virus

Species of virus

Pea streak virus (PeSV) is a plant pathogenic virus.
