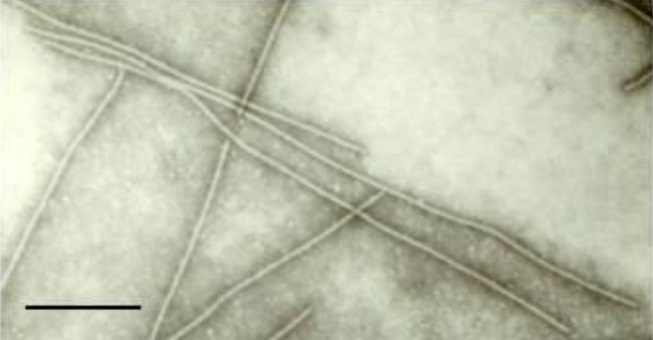

Virus classification
- (unranked): Virus
- Realm: Riboviria
- Kingdom: Orthornavirae
- Phylum: Kitrinoviricota
- Class: Alsuviricetes
- Order: Tymovirales
- Family: Betaflexiviridae
- Subfamily: Quinvirinae
- Genus: Carlavirus

Species
- See text

Synonyms
- Carnation latent virus group

= Carlavirus =

Genus of viruses

Carlavirus, formerly known as the "Carnation latent virus group", is a genus of viruses in the order Tymovirales, in the family Betaflexiviridae. Plants serve as natural hosts. There are 73 species in this genus. Diseases associated with this genus include: mosaic and ringspot symptoms.

== Description ==
Carlavirus is described in the 9th report of the ICTV (2009). The genus is characterised by having six ORFs (open reading frames) including a TGB (Triple Gene Block). The viruses are transmitted by insects.

== Taxonomy ==
The genus was first proposed in the first report of the ICTV in 1971, as the 'Carnation latent virus group' but was renamed in 1975 as the 'Carlavirus group', and as the genus Carlavirus in 1995 (6th report). In 2005 (8th report) it was placed in the Flexiviridae family, having previously been unassigned. The current position in the 9th report (2009) as a genus of the family Betaflexiviridae derives from the subsequent subdivision of Flexiviridae.

The following species are assigned to the genus, listed by scientific name and followed by the exemplar virus of the species:

- Carlavirus alphacapsici, Pepper virus A
- Carlavirus alphacliviae, Clivia carlavirus A
- Carlavirus alphaconiti, Aconite virus A
- Carlavirus alphaligustri, Ligustrum virus A
- Carlavirus alpharosae, Rose virus A
- Carlavirus americanense, American hop latent virus
- Carlavirus atractylodis, Atractylodes mottle virus
- Carlavirus betachrysanthemi, Chrysanthemum virus B
- Carlavirus betagapanthi, Agapanthus carlavirus B
- Carlavirus betaphlocis, Phlox virus B
- Carlavirus betarosae, Rose virus B
- Carlavirus betulae, Birch carlavirus
- Carlavirus chisolani, Potato virus H
- Carlavirus chloroipomoeae, Sweet potato chlorotic fleck virus
- Carlavirus colei, Coleus vein necrosis virus
- Carlavirus cucumis, Cucumber vein-clearing virus
- Carlavirus deltasambuci, Sambucus virus D
- Carlavirus duocacti, Cactus carlavirus 2
- Carlavirus duopseudostellariae, Pseudostellaria heterophylla carlavirus 2
- Carlavirus epsilonsambuci, Sambucus virus E
- Carlavirus fragariae, Strawberry pseudo mild yellow edge virus
- Carlavirus gammasambuci, Sambucus virus C
- Carlavirus hellebori, Helleborus mosaic virus
- Carlavirus humuli, Hop mosaic virus
- Carlavirus hydrangeae, Hydrangea chlorotic mottle virus
- Carlavirus ipomoeae, Sweet potato C6 virus
- Carlavirus jasmini, Jasmine virus C
- Carlavirus latensaconiti, Aconitum latent virus
- Carlavirus latensallii, Garlic common latent virus
- Carlavirus latensascalonici, Shallot latent virus
- Carlavirus latensbrassicae, Cole latent virus
- Carlavirus latenscapparis, Caper latent virus
- Carlavirus latensdianthi, Carnation latent virus
- Carlavirus latensdioscoreae, Yam latent virus
- Carlavirus latensgaillardiae, Gaillardia latent virus
- Carlavirus latenshippeastri, Hippeastrum latent virus
- Carlavirus latenshumuli, Hop latent virus
- Carlavirus latenskalanchoe, Kalanchoe latent virus
- Carlavirus latensnarcissi, Narcissus common latent virus
- Carlavirus latensnerinis, Nerine latent virus
- Carlavirus latensolani, Potato latent virus
- Carlavirus latenspassiflorae, Passiflora latent virus
- Carlavirus latensverbenae, Verbena latent virus
- Carlavirus lilii, Lily symptomless virus
- Carlavirus maculapapayae, Papaya mottle-associated virus
- Carlavirus melonis, Melon yellowing-associated virus
- Carlavirus menthae, Mint virus C
- Carlavirus miphlocis, Phlox virus M
- Carlavirus mirabilis, Mirabilis jalapa mottle virus
- Carlavirus misolani, Potato virus M
- Carlavirus mitipapayae, Papaya mild mottle associated virus
- Carlavirus necroligustri, Ligustrum necrotic ringspot virus
- Carlavirus necroretis, Helleborus net necrosis virus
- Carlavirus oleraceae, Cole mild mosaic virus
- Carlavirus petasitis, Butterbur mosaic virus
- Carlavirus pisi, Pea streak virus
- Carlavirus pisolani, Potato virus P
- Carlavirus populi, Poplar mosaic virus
- Carlavirus rhochrysanthemi, Chrysanthemum virus R
- Carlavirus sigmadaphnis, Daphne virus S
- Carlavirus sigmahelenii, Helenium virus S
- Carlavirus sigmaphlocis, Phlox virus S
- Carlavirus sigmascalonici, Shallot virus S
- Carlavirus sigmasolani, Potato virus S
- Carlavirus sigmavaccinii, Blueberry virus S
- Carlavirus trifolii, Red clover vein mosaic virus
- Carlavirus tripseudostellariae, Pseudostellaria heterophylla carlavirus 3
- Carlavirus unicacti, Cactus carlavirus 1
- Carlavirus uniglycinis, Soybean carlavirus 1
- Carlavirus unipseudostellariae, Pseudostellaria heterophylla carlavirus 1
- Carlavirus unisteviae, Stevia carlavirus 1
- Carlavirus vaccinii, Blueberry scorch virus
- Carlavirus vignae, Cowpea mild mottle virus

== Virology ==
The virions are non enveloped, filamentous, 610–700 nanometers (nm) and 12–15 nm in diameter.

The linear 5.8–9 kilobase genome is positive sense, single-stranded RNA. The 3’ terminus is polyadenylated. In some species the 5’ end is capped. The genome encodes 3 to 6 proteins including a coat protein located at the 3' end and an RNA-dependent RNA polymerase located at the 5' end of the genome.

== Life cycle ==
Viral replication is cytoplasmic, and is lysogenic. Entry into the host cell is achieved by penetration into the host cell. Replication follows the positive stranded RNA virus replication model. Positive stranded RNA virus transcription is the method of transcription. The virus exits the host cell by tripartite non-tubule guided viral movement. Plants serve as the natural host.

Genus	Host details	Tissue tropism	Entry details	Release details	Replication site	Assembly site	Transmission
Carlavirus	Plants	None	Viral movement; mechanical inoculation	Viral movement	Cytoplasm	Cytoplasm	Mechanical: insects

=== Transmission ===
Infection is at times spread by aphids in a semi-persistent mode, that is, the vector is infective for a number of hours.(Pimentel) Some species are transmitted by Bemisia tabaci in a semi-persistent mode or through the seed. Most species infect only a few hosts and cause infections with few or no symptoms, for example, American hop latent virus and lily symptomless virus. Some, such as blueberry scorch virus and poplar mosaic virus, cause serious illnesses. (Foster)

== Bibliography ==
- Martelli, Giovanni P.; Saldarelli, Pasquale (2012). "Carlavirus". In Tidona, Christian; Gholamreza, Darai (eds.). The Springer index of viruses (2 ed.). New York, NY: Springer. pp. 521–532. ISBN 978-0387959191.
- Astier, S. Principles of Plant Virology
- Foster, Gary. "Carlavirus Isolation and RNA Extraction." Foster, Gary D. and Sally C. Taylorin. Plant Virology Protocols: From Virus Isolation to Transgenic Resistance. Page 145. 1998. Humana Press. Online. February 13, 2008.
- Pimentel, David. Encyclopedia of Pest Management.Page 407. CRC Press. 2002/ Google Books. Online February 13, 2008.. ISBN 0824706323
- King, Andrew M. Q.; et al., eds. (2012). "Carlavirus". Virus taxonomy : classification and nomenclature of viruses : ninth report of the International Committee on Taxonomy of Viruses. London: Academic Press. p. 924. ISBN 978-0123846846.
