= Grapevine virus F =

Virus classification
- (unranked): Virus
- Realm: Riboviria
- Kingdom: Orthornavirae
- Phylum: Kitrinoviricota
- Class: Alsuviricetes
- Order: Tymovirales
- Family: Betaflexiviridae
- Genus: Vitivirus
- Species: Vitivirus phivitis

Species of virus

Grapevine virus F (GVF) is a plant virus species in the genus Vitivirus.
