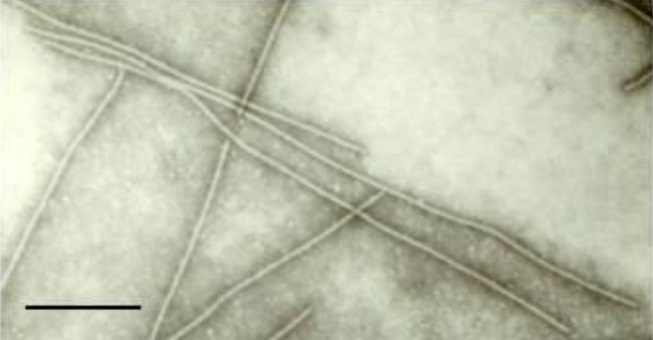
- TEM showing CPMMV particles in sap of symptomatic yardlong bean leaf. Bar = 100 nm

Virus classification
- (unranked): Virus
- Realm: Riboviria
- Kingdom: Orthornavirae
- Phylum: Kitrinoviricota
- Class: Alsuviricetes
- Order: Tymovirales
- Family: Betaflexiviridae
- Genus: Carlavirus
- Species: Carlavirus vignae

Synonyms
- Bean angular mosaic virus; Voandezia mosaic virus; Groundnut crinkle virus; Psophocarpus necrotic mosaic virus

= Cowpea mild mottle virus =

Species of virus

Cowpea mild mottle virus (CPMMV) is a plant pathogenic virus of the family Betaflexiviridae that infects yardlong beans, soybeans and peanuts. It is transmitted by whiteflies that feed on the underside of plant leaves. Symptoms of infection include leaf mottling, mild mosaic, and leaf malformations. According to the Handbook of Plant Virus Diseases, the pathogen is found in "China, India, Indonesia, Ivory Coast, Nigeria, Thailand, Philippines, Papua New Guinea [and] Sudan".
