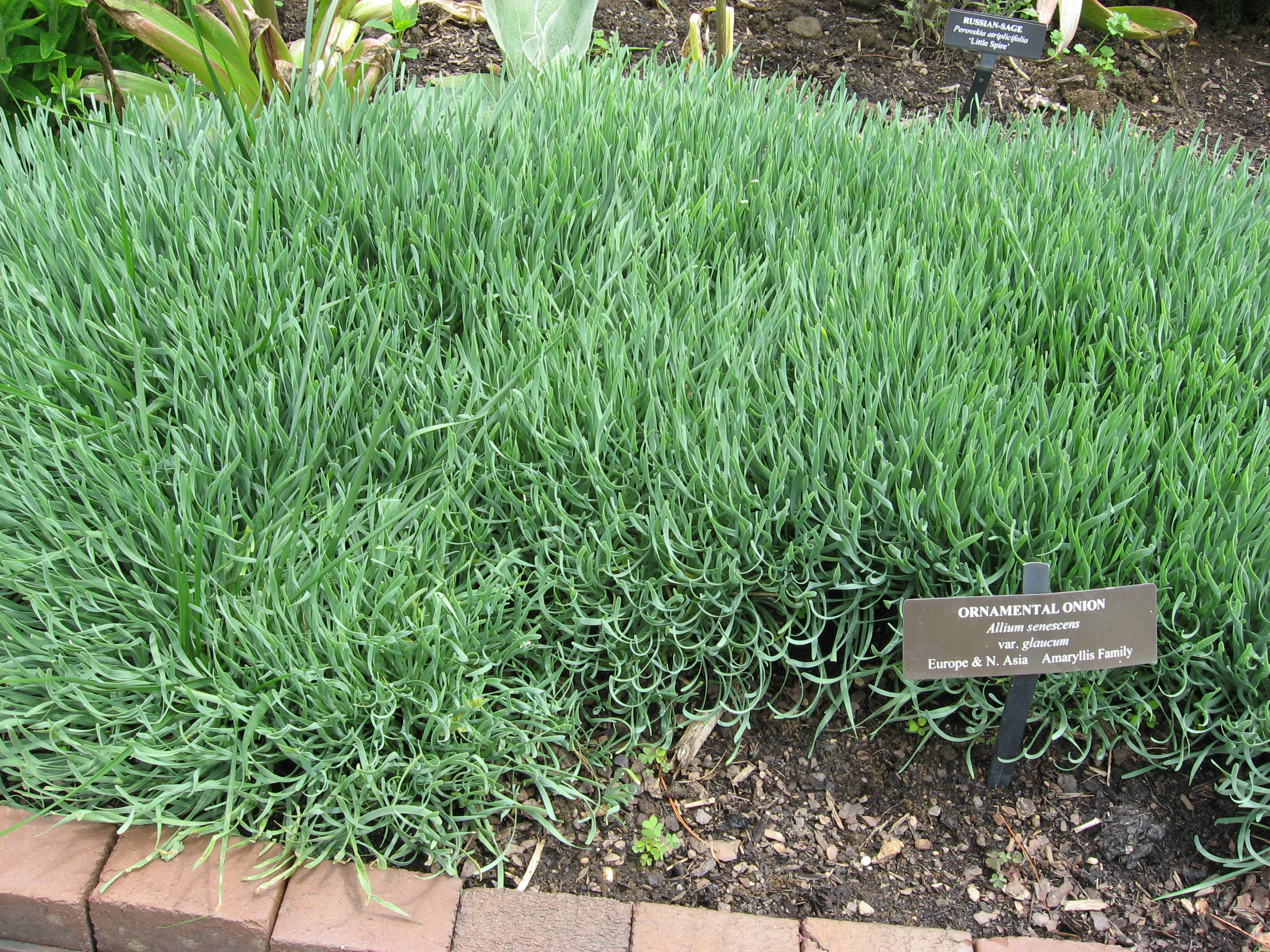

Scientific classification
- Kingdom: Plantae
- Clade: Tracheophytes
- Clade: Angiosperms
- Clade: Monocots
- Order: Asparagales
- Family: Amaryllidaceae
- Subfamily: Allioideae
- Genus: Allium
- Species: A. senescens
- Subspecies: A. s. subsp. glaucum

Trinomial name
- Allium senescens subsp. glaucum (Schrad. ex Poir.) Dostál

= Allium senescens subsp. glaucum =

Subspecies of flowering plant

Allium senescens subsp. glaucum (German garlic), is a plant in the genus Allium. It is native to Siberia and Mongolia.

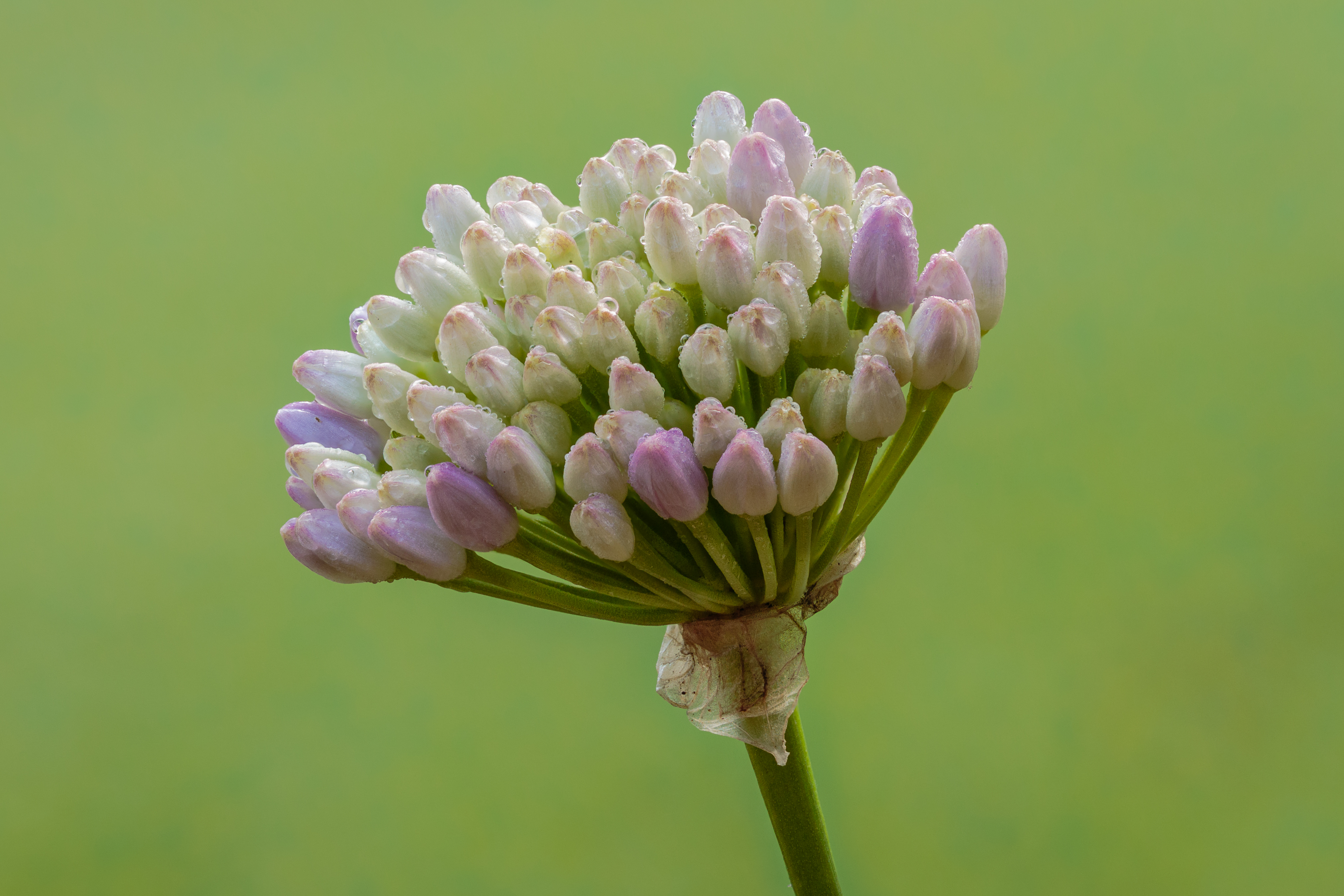
Flowers
