= Heterodera goettingiana =

Scientific classification
- Domain: Eukaryota
- Kingdom: Animalia
- Phylum: Nematoda
- Class: Secernentea
- Order: Tylenchida
- Family: Heteroderidae
- Genus: Heterodera
- Species: H. goettingiana

Binomial name
- Heterodera goettingiana Liebscher, (1892)

Synonyms
- Heterodera schachtii (pea strain); Heterodera (Heterodera) goettingiana

Species of roundworm

Heterodera goettingiana, the pea cyst nematode, is a plant pathogenic nematode affecting peas.

== See also ==
- List of pea diseases
- Agriculture of the United Kingdom
