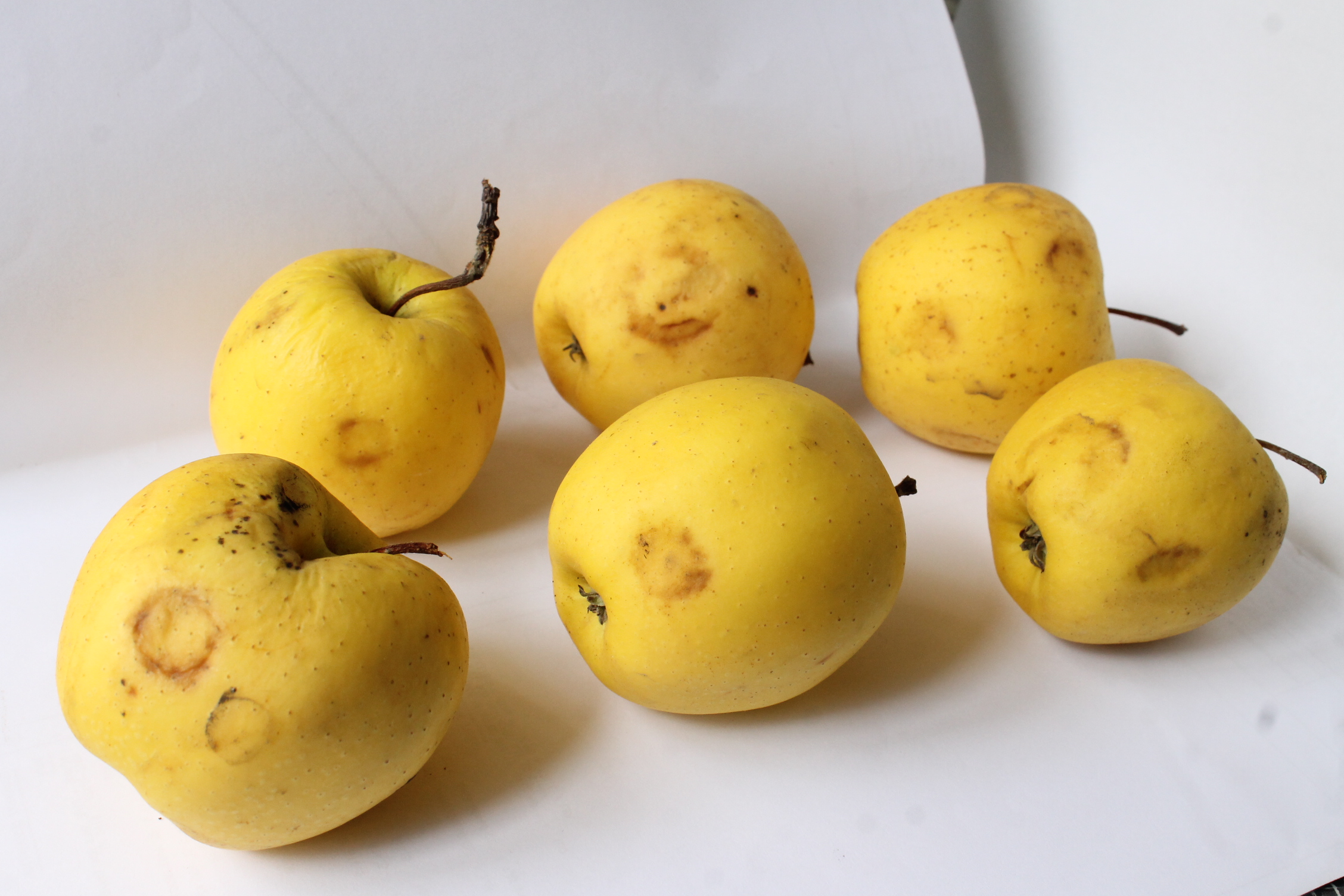

Virus classification
- (unranked): Virus
- Realm: Riboviria
- Kingdom: Orthornavirae
- Phylum: Kitrinoviricota
- Class: Alsuviricetes
- Order: Tymovirales
- Family: Betaflexiviridae
- Genus: Trichovirus
- Species: Trichovirus mali

Synonyms
- pear ring pattern mosaic virus apple latent virus type 1 plum pseudopox virus quince stunt virus

= Apple chlorotic leafspot virus =

Species of virus

Apple chlorotic leafspot virus (ACLSV) is a plant pathogenic virus of the family Betaflexiviridae.

== Damages ==
This virus reduces tree vigor (50% on pear), reduces yield (40% on pear), and causes quality reduction on fruits (if symptomatic).

== Pathogen ==
This virus is a trichovirus with filamentous particles. It has no natural vectors and it is easily transmitted mechanically to herbaceous hosts.

== Transmission ==
The virus is only transmitted by grafting using infected clonal rootstocks, top-working existing trees with infected scion cultivars, and using infected trees as a source of propagation materials.
