= Fusarium oxysporum f.sp. pisi =

Scientific classification
- Kingdom: Fungi
- Division: Ascomycota
- Class: Sordariomycetes
- Order: Hypocreales
- Family: Nectriaceae
- Genus: Fusarium
- Species: F. oxysporum
- Forma specialis: F. o. f.sp. pisi

Trionomial name
- Fusarium oxysporum f.sp. pisi W.C. Snyder & H.N. Hansen, (1940)

Synonyms
- Fusarium bulbigenum var. pisi (Linford) Raillo, (1950); Fusarium orthoceras var. pisi Linford, (1928); Fusarium oxysporum f. pisi (Linford) W.C. Snyder & H.N. Hansen, (1940); Fusarium oxysporum var. pisi (C.J.J. Hall) Raillo, (1950); Fusarium vasinfectum var. pisi Schikora; Fusarium vasinfectum var. pisi C.J.J. Hall, (1903)

Fungal plant pathogen

Fusarium oxysporum f.sp. pisi (FoP) is a fungal plant pathogen infecting peas, endemic to Moldova. Currently, it has been detected in almost all regions where peas are grown and can be distinguished into 4 races: race 1, race 2, race 5 and race 6. Often when infecting peas, FoP infects in tandem with other Fusarium species, Aphanomyces euteiches and various other root infecting fungi and oomycetes to cause root rot symptoms. FoP infects its pea host through the roots to enter the vascular system of the host.

The resistance of peas to FOP is either determined by a single gene for races 1, 5 and 6, or is determined by multiple genes for race 2.
