= Colletotrichum pisi =

Scientific classification
- Domain: Eukaryota
- Kingdom: Fungi
- Division: Ascomycota
- Class: Sordariomycetes
- Order: Glomerellales
- Family: Glomerellaceae
- Genus: Colletotrichum
- Species: C. pisi

Binomial name
- Colletotrichum pisi Pat., (1891)

Species of fungus

Colletotrichum pisi is a plant pathogen.
