= Gammaflexiviridae =

Virus classification
- (unranked): Virus
- Realm: Riboviria
- Kingdom: Orthornavirae
- Phylum: Kitrinoviricota
- Class: Alsuviricetes
- Order: Tymovirales
- Family: Gammaflexiviridae

Family of viruses

Gammaflexiviridae is a family of viruses in the order Tymovirales. Fungi serve as natural hosts. The family has three genera.

== Taxonomy ==
The family contains the following genera:

- Gammaflexivirus
- Mycoflexivirus
- Xylavirus

== Structure ==
Viruses in Gammaflexiviridae are non-enveloped, with flexuous and filamentous geometries. The diameter is around 12-13 nm, with a length of 720 nm. Genomes are linear, around 6.8kb in length. The genome has 2 open reading frames.

== Life cycle ==
Viral replication is cytoplasmic. Entry into the host cell is achieved by penetration into the host cell. Replication follows the positive stranded RNA virus replication model. Positive stranded RNA virus transcription is the method of transcription. Fungi serve as the natural host.
