= Tymovirus coat protein =

Tymo_coat
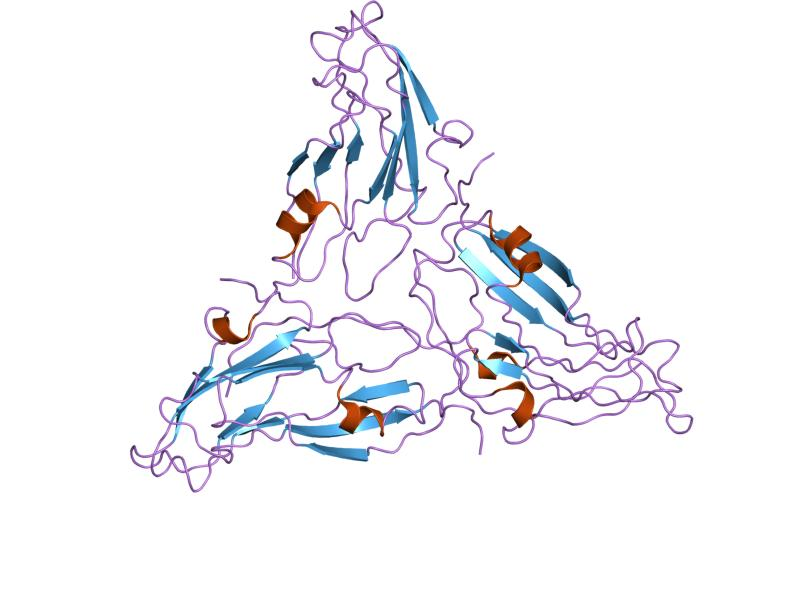
- physalis mottle virus: empty capsid

Identifiers
- Symbol: Tymo_coat
- Pfam: PF00983
- Pfam clan: CL0055
- InterPro: IPR000574
- SCOP2: 1auy / SCOPe / SUPFAM
Available protein structures:
- PDB: IPR000574 PF00983 (ECOD; PDBsum)
- AlphaFold: IPR000574; PF00983

In molecular biology, the Tymovirus coat protein refers to the protein coat of a virus order, named Tymovirales. More specifically this protein signature is found only in coat proteins from the related tymoviruses. The coat protein (CP) is also known as the virion protein. The virus coat is composed of 180 copies of the coat protein arranged in an icosahedral shell.

== Function ==
Fundamentally, the viral coat protein functions as protection for the genetic material inside the virus, and as an aid to infecting the host cell with virus DNA. Essentially, the coat protein (CP) is a link between the genetic material and infecting the host. Since the genetic material in the virus consists of RNA the coat protein contains RNA binding sites. Additionally, the coat protein contains conserved histadine amino acid residues which help the virus to spread.

== Structure ==
There are three subunits named, A, B and C. It contains a beta-jelly roll motif which consists of 9 beta-strands.
