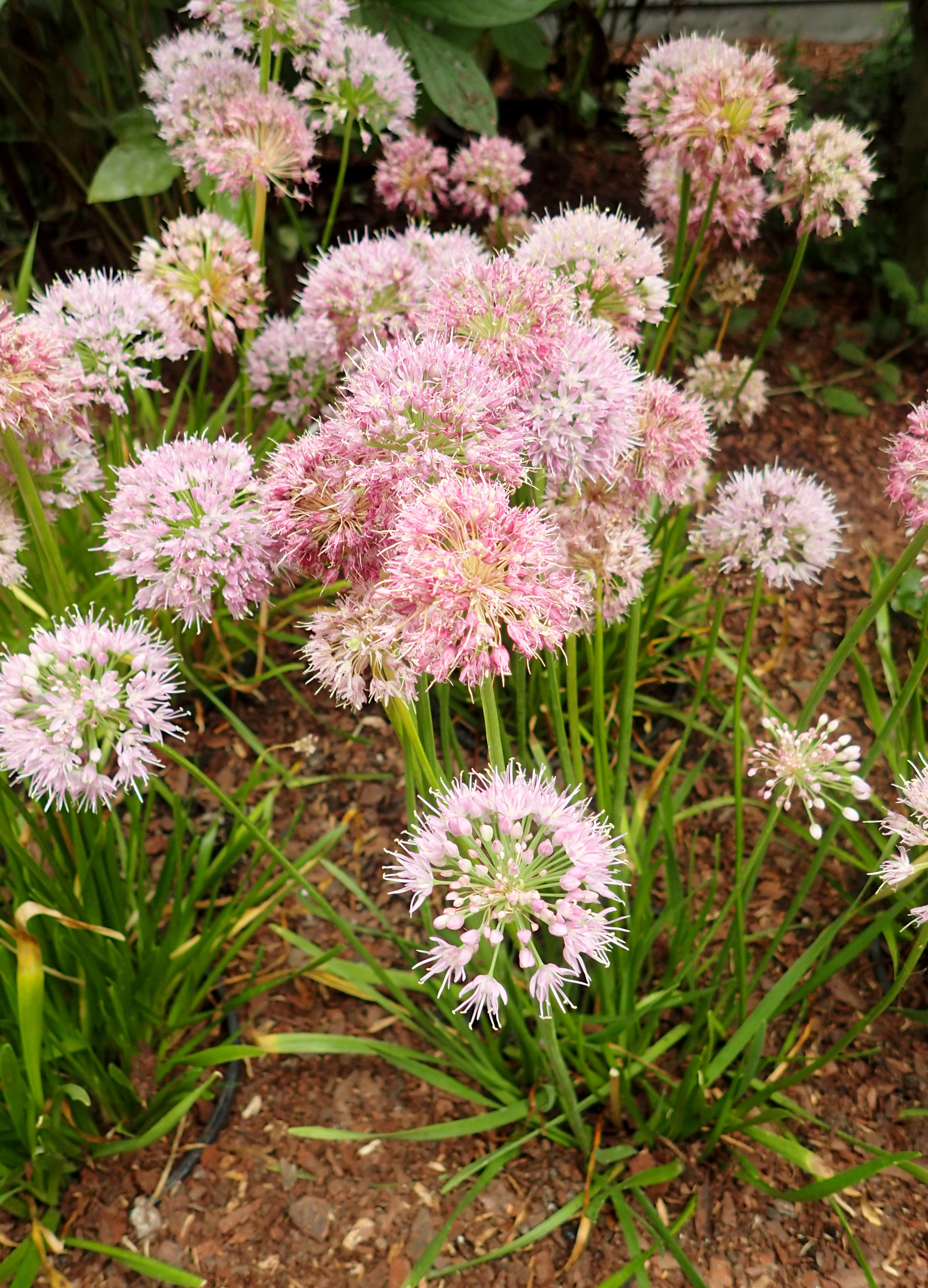
- Allium nutans at the New York Botanical Garden

Scientific classification
- Kingdom: Plantae
- Clade: Tracheophytes
- Clade: Angiosperms
- Clade: Monocots
- Order: Asparagales
- Family: Amaryllidaceae
- Subfamily: Allioideae
- Genus: Allium
- Subgenus: A. subg. Rhizirideum
- Species: A. nutans

Binomial name
- Allium nutans L. 1753 not Schult. & Schult.f. 1830

Synonyms
- Allium tataricum Schult. & Schult.f.; Allium undulatum Schousb. ex Trev.; Porrum nutans (L.) Raf.

= Allium nutans =

Species of flowering plant

Allium nutans, English common name Siberian chives or blue chives, is a species of onion native to European Russia, Kazakhstan, Mongolia, Tibet, Xinjiang, and Asiatic Russia (Altay Krai, Krasnoyarsk, Tuva, Western Siberia, Amur Oblast). It grows in wet meadows and other damp locations.

Allium nutans has one or two bulbs up to 1.5 to 2.0 cm (5/8 to 3/4 in) in diameter. Scapes are winged and 2-angled, 30 to 60 cm (12 to 24 in) tall. Leaves are flat, tapering at both ends, 6 to 10 mm (0.24 to 0.39 in) wide at the widest spot (rarely to 15 mm or 0.59 in), about half as long as the scapes. Umbels are spherical, with many pink to pale purple flowers.
