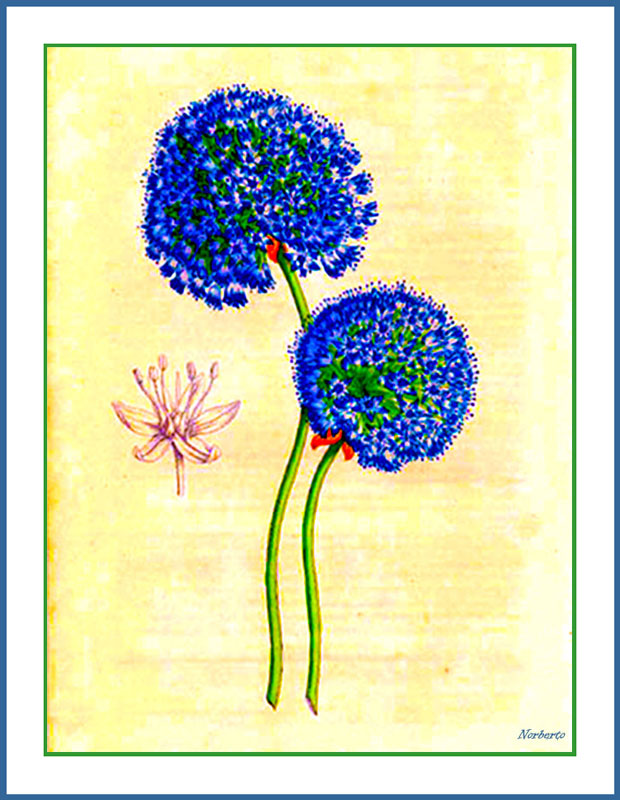
- 1847 illustration

Scientific classification
- Kingdom: Plantae
- Clade: Tracheophytes
- Clade: Angiosperms
- Clade: Monocots
- Order: Asparagales
- Family: Amaryllidaceae
- Subfamily: Allioideae
- Genus: Allium
- Subgenus: A. subg. Allium
- Species: A. caeruleum

Binomial name
- Allium caeruleum Pall.

Synonyms
- Allium azureum Ledeb.; Allium caerulescens G.Don; Allium viviparum Kar. & Kir.

= Allium caeruleum =

blue-of-the-heavens Лук голубой 棱叶薤 leng ye xie

Species of flowering plant

Allium caeruleum (blue globe onion, blue ornamental onion, blue-of-the-heavens, blue-flowered garlic; syn. Allium azureum Ledeb.) is an ornamental bulbous plant of the onion genus, native to Central Asia (Kazakhstan, Kyrgyzstan, Siberia, Tajikistan, Uzbekistan, and Xinjiang). In these regions, it is found on dry slopes, plains, and steppes.

This plant is cited in the Flore des Serres et des Jardins de l'Europe puis L'illustration horticole by Charles Antoine Lemaire. It grows to 80 cm (31"), producing strap-shaped leaves and small globes (umbels) of blue flowers in early summer. The one-inch wide globular flower heads attract butterflies. The plant has been granted the British Royal Horticultural Society's Award of Garden Merit (1993).

A. caeruleum thrives in well-drained soil in full to partial sun. It is deer-resistant and suitable for USDA hardiness zones 4–8.

== Gallery ==
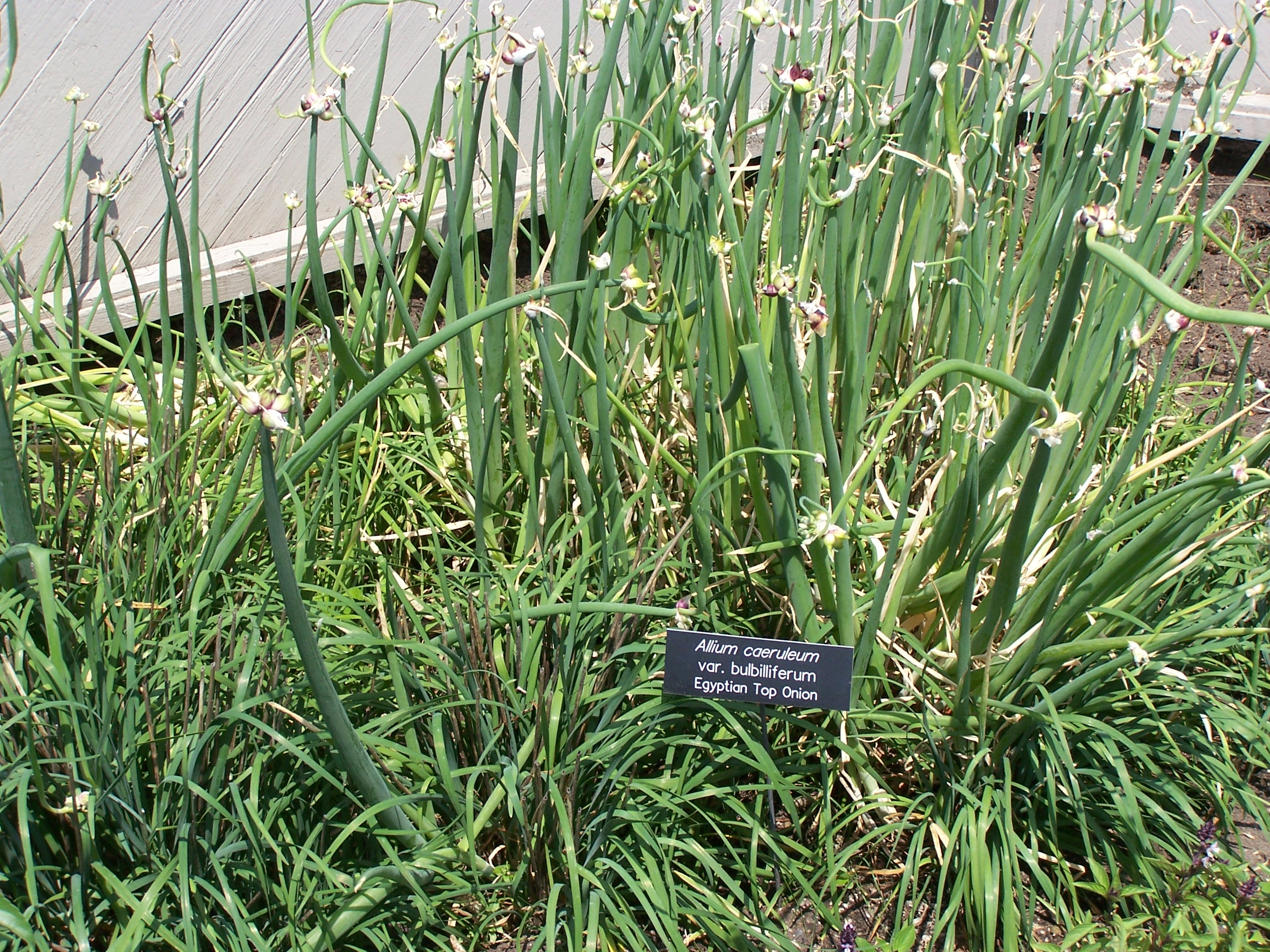
Allium caeruleum var. bulbilliferum Egyptian Top Onion at Minnesota Landscape Arboretum

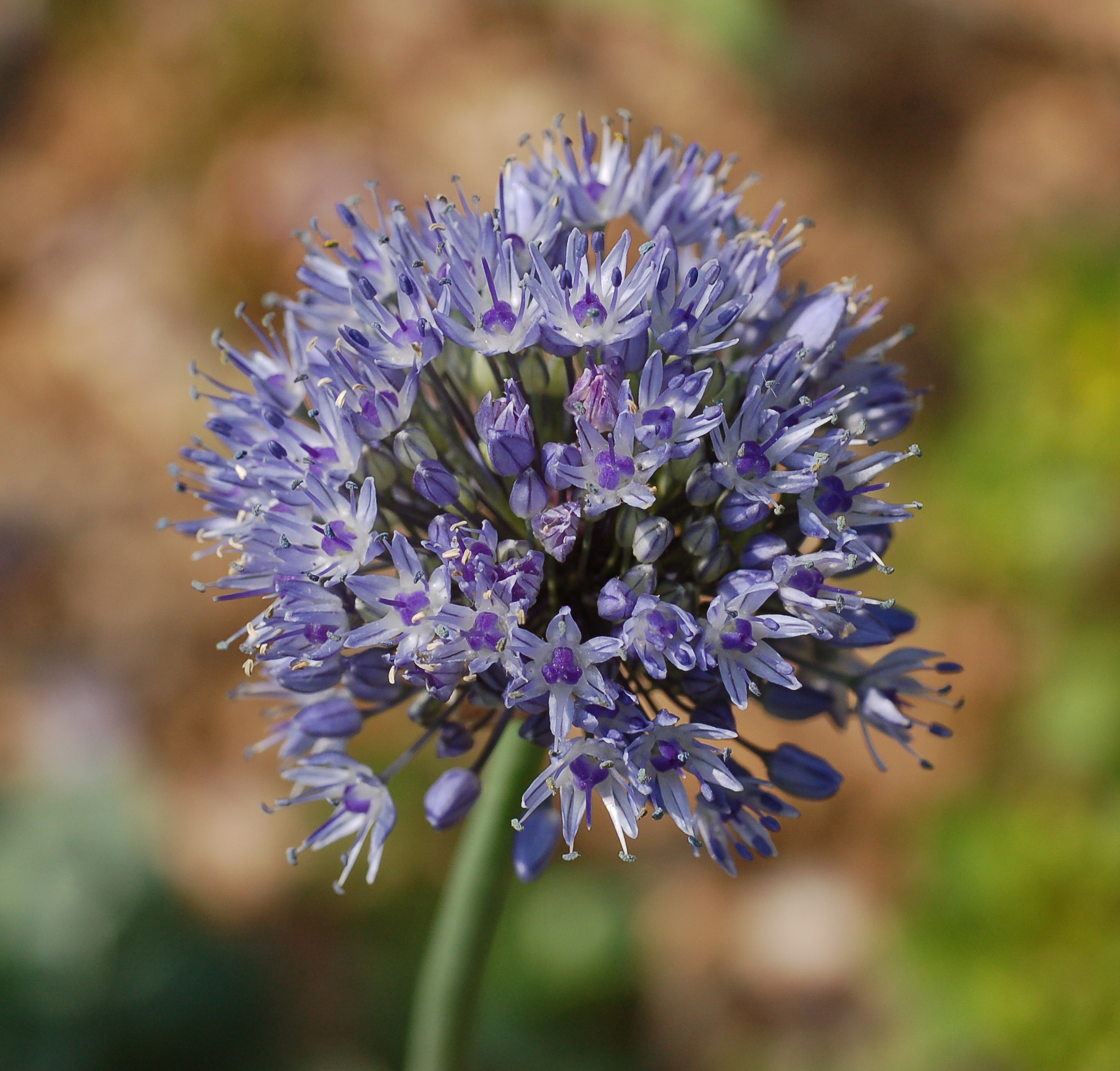
Flower head closeup
