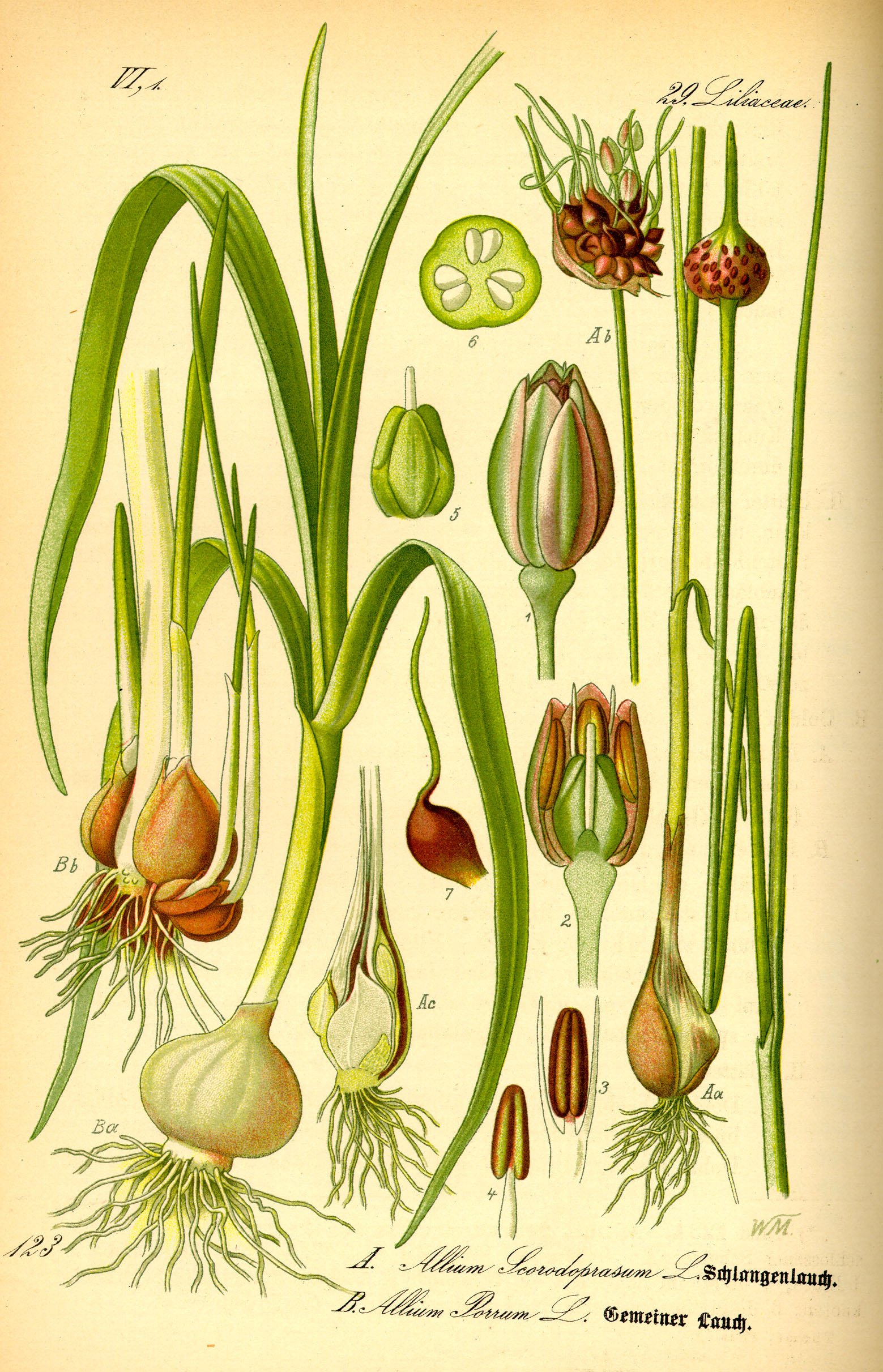
- Allium scorodoprasum

Conservation status
- Least Concern (IUCN 3.1)

Scientific classification
- Kingdom: Plantae
- Clade: Tracheophytes
- Clade: Angiosperms
- Clade: Monocots
- Order: Asparagales
- Family: Amaryllidaceae
- Subfamily: Allioideae
- Genus: Allium
- Subgenus: A. subg. Allium
- Species: A. scorodoprasum

Binomial name
- Allium scorodoprasum L.

Synonyms
- Synonymy: Ascalonicum scorodoprasum (L.) P.Renault; Porrum scorodoprasum (L.) Rchb.; Allium arenarium L.; Allium contortum Stokes; Allium obscurum M.Bieb. ex Schult. & Schult.f.; Porrum arenarium (L.) Rchb.; Allium neglectum Wender.; Allium scorodoprasum var. multibulbillosum Y.N.Lee; Allium supranisianum Sailer; Allium persicum Fisch. ex Regel

= Allium scorodoprasum =

Sand leek, rocambole

Species of flowering plant

The sand leek (Allium scorodoprasum), also known as rocambole and Korean pickled-peel garlic, is a Eurasian species of wild onion with a native range extending across much of Europe, Middle East, and Korea.

The species should not be confused with rocambole garlic, which is A. sativum var. ophioscorodon.

== Description ==
The sand leek is a perennial plant with an egg-shaped bulb. The plant produces two to five unstalked leaves, the bases of which are sheath-like. Each leaf blade is linear, 7–20 millimetres (1/4–3/4 in) wide, flat with a slight keel, an entire margin and parallel veins. The edges of the leaf and the central vein are rough to the touch. The flowering stem is cylindrical, growing to a height of 30 to 90 cm (12 to 35 in) and the upper half is leafless. The whole plant has an onion-like aroma.

The inflorescence is a globular cluster surrounded by membranous bracts in bud which wither when the flowers open. Each individual flower is stalked and has a purple perianth 4 to 7 mm (1/8 to 1/4 in) long. There are six tepals, six stamens and a pistil formed from three fused carpels. Mixed with the flowers are a number of purple bulbils. The fruit is a capsule, but the seeds rarely set, and propagation usually takes place when the bulbils are knocked off and grow into new plants.

== Distribution and habitat ==
The natural habitat of A. scorodoprasum is damp broad-leaved woodland, forest margins, shores, hillside meadows and hedgerows. It was at one time used as a kitchen herb and can occasionally be found near old habitations.

== Cultivation ==
A. scorodoprasum is edible, but rarely cultivated, and has a shorter flower stalk and fewer and more inconsistently shaped cloves than Rocambole garlic. Sand leek also has a dark violet bulb wrapper.

Elephant garlic (properly A. ampeloprasum var. ampeloprasum) is also sometimes incorrectly sold as A. scorodoprasum.

== Uses ==
The bulbs and flower bulbils can be cooked similar to garlic, with a milder flavor.
