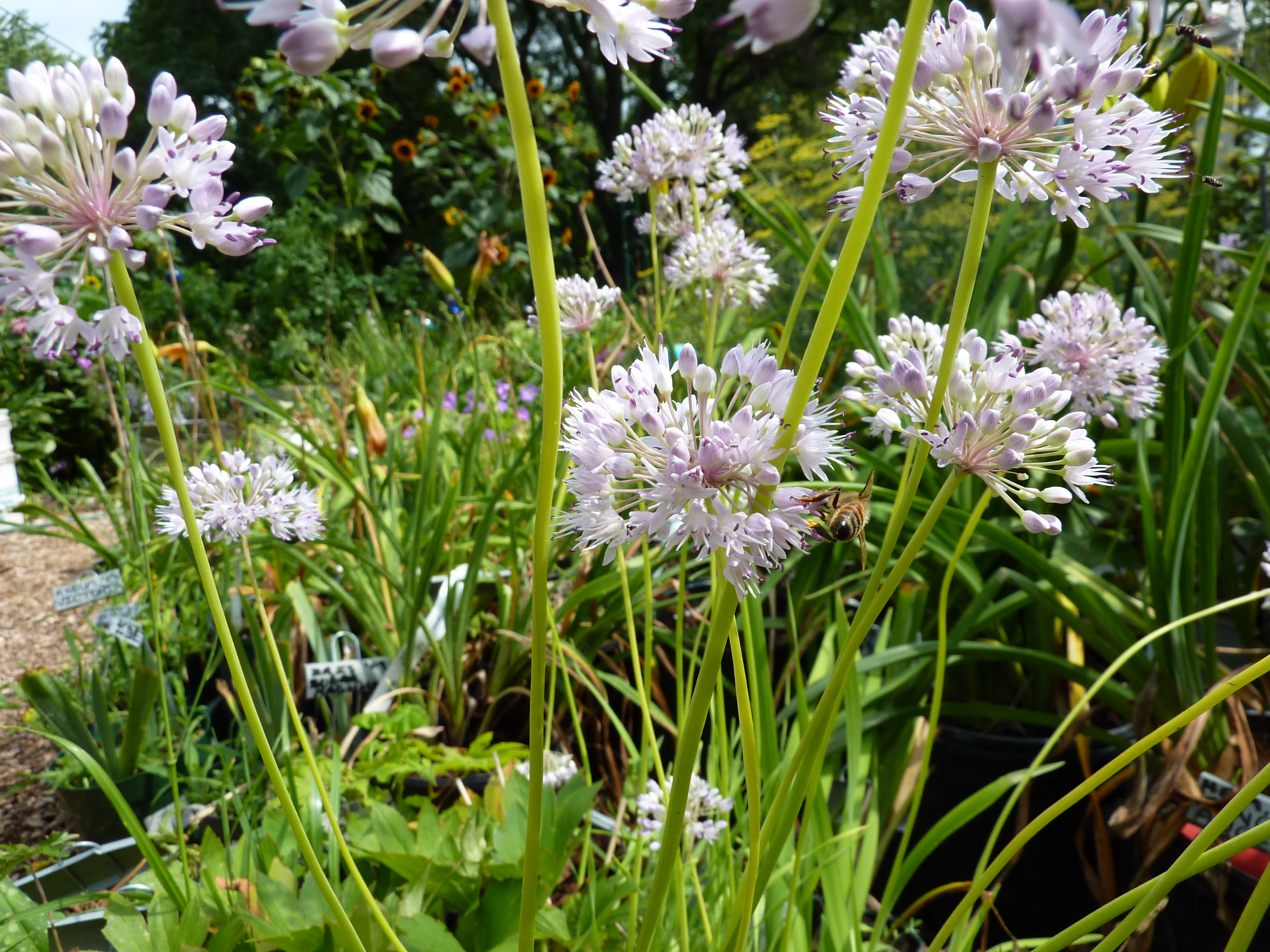

Conservation status
- Least Concern (IUCN 3.1)

Scientific classification
- Kingdom: Plantae
- Clade: Tracheophytes
- Clade: Angiosperms
- Clade: Monocots
- Order: Asparagales
- Family: Amaryllidaceae
- Subfamily: Allioideae
- Genus: Allium
- Subgenus: A. subg. Rhizirideum
- Species: A. senescens

Binomial name
- Allium senescens L.

Subspecies
- A. s. subsp. montanum; A. s. subsp. senescens^{List source:}

= Allium senescens =

German garlic

Species of plant

Allium senescens, commonly called aging chive, German garlic, broadleaf chives, or dumebuchu, is a species of flowering plant in the genus Allium (which includes all the ornamental and culinary onions and garlic).

== Description ==
A bulbous herbaceous perennial, it produces up to 30 pink flowers in characteristic allium umbels in the mid to late summer and grows 8–40 inches (20–102 cm) in height. The foliage is thin and straplike.

== Taxonomy ==
Two subspecies have been named:

- Allium senescens subsp. glaucum
- Allium senescens subsp. senescens

== Distribution ==
Allium senescens is native to northern Europe and Asia, from Siberia to Korea. It has been introduced and naturalized in some parts of Europe, including the Czech Republic and former Yugoslavia.

== Uses ==
Allium senescens is grown for its ornamental qualities, and as a gene source because of its tertiary genetic relationship to A. cepa (the common onion). In the UK it has received the Royal Horticultural Society's Award of Garden Merit.
