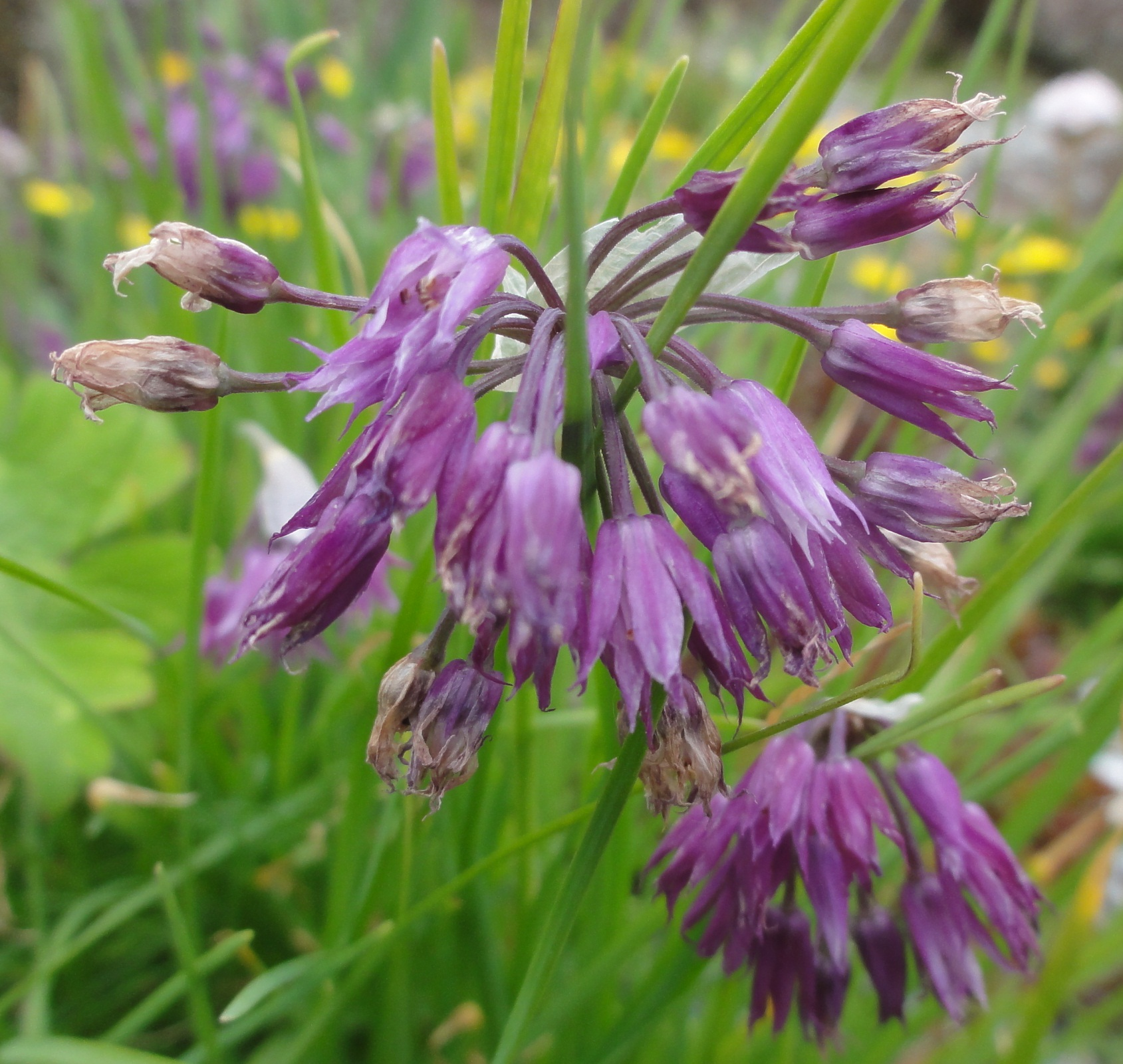
- A. cyathophorum var. farreri

Scientific classification
- Kingdom: Plantae
- Clade: Tracheophytes
- Clade: Angiosperms
- Clade: Monocots
- Order: Asparagales
- Family: Amaryllidaceae
- Subfamily: Allioideae
- Genus: Allium
- Subgenus: A. subg. Cyathophora
- Species: A. cyathophorum

Binomial name
- Allium cyathophorum Bureau & Franch.

= Allium cyathophorum =

Species of plant

Allium cyathophorum is a Chinese (Chinese: 杯花韭, bei hua jiu) species of flowering plant in the onion genus Allium of the family Amaryllidaceae. It grows at elevations from 2,700 metres (8,900 ft) up to 4,600 metres (15,100 ft).

== Description ==
This bulbous herbaceous perennial has thick roots but thin, fibrous bulbs. The scapes are usually 2-angled, up to 15 cm (5.9 in) tall. The leaves are flat, narrowly linear, usually shorter than the scapes. The umbels are hemispheric (half spheres) with purple flowers.

== Taxonomy ==
Allium cyathophorum is found in the third evolutionary line of the genus Allium. It is a member of the subgenus Cyathophora and is the type species for that subgenus.

=== Varieties ===
Two infraspecific varieties are recognized:

- Allium cyathophorum var. cyathophorum (Syn. Allium venustum C.H.Wright) – tepals blunt-tipped – Qinghai, Sichuan, Tibet, Yunnan
- Allium cyathophorum var. farreri (Stearn) Stearn (Syn. Allium farreri Stearn) – tepals pointed at the tips – Gansu, Sichuan

William Stearn originally named Allium farreri in 1930 after Reginald Farrer, but in 1950 realised it was a variety of Allium cyathophorum, and so renamed it.

== Bibliography ==
- Stearn, William T. (1930). "A new Allium from China (A. farreri, sp. nov.)". Journal of Botany. 68: 342–343.
- Stearn, W. T. (1955a). "Allium cyathophorum var. farreri". Curtis's Botanical Magazine. 170 (new series): tab. 252.
- "World Checklist of Selected Plant Families". Royal Botanic Gardens, Kew.
