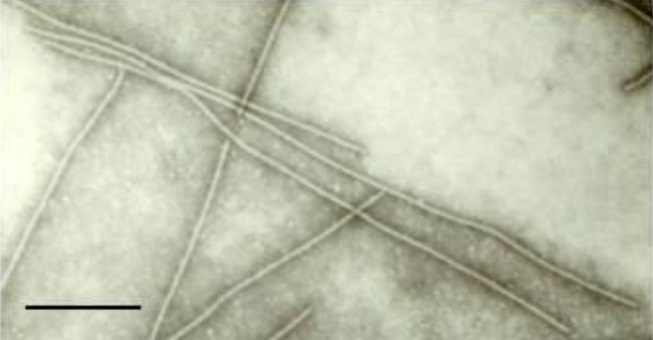
- TEM showing CPMMV particles in sap of symptomatic yardlong bean leaf. Bar = 100 nm

Virus classification
- (unranked): Virus
- Realm: Riboviria
- Kingdom: Orthornavirae
- Phylum: Kitrinoviricota
- Class: Alsuviricetes
- Order: Tymovirales
- Family: Betaflexiviridae

Subtaxa
- See text

= Betaflexiviridae =

Family of viruses

Betaflexiviridae is a family of viruses in the order Tymovirales. Plants and fungi serve as natural hosts. The family has 15 genera assigned to two subfamilies. Diseases associated with this family include mosaic and ringspot symptoms.

== Taxonomy ==
The following subfamilies and genera are recognized (-virinae denotes subfamily and -virus denotes genus):

- Quinvirinae
  - Banmivirus
  - Carlavirus
  - Foveavirus
  - Robigovirus
  - Sustrivirus
- Trivirinae
  - Capillovirus
  - Chordovirus
  - Citrivirus
  - Divavirus
  - Prunevirus
  - Ravavirus
  - Tepovirus
  - Trichovirus
  - Vitivirus
  - Wamavirus

== Structure ==
Viruses in Betaflexiviridae are non-enveloped, with flexuous and Filamentous geometries. The diameter is approximately 12–13 nm. Genomes are linear, around 6.5–9kb in length. The genome codes for 2 to 6 proteins.

== Life cycle ==
Viral replication is cytoplasmic, and is lysogenic. Entry into the host cell is achieved by penetration into the host cell. Replication follows the positive stranded RNA virus replication model. Positive stranded RNA virus transcription is the method of transcription. The virus exits the host cell by tripartite non-tubule guided viral movement, and tubule-guided viral movement. Plants and fungi serve as the natural host. The virus is transmitted via a vector (insects). Transmission routes are vector and mechanical.
