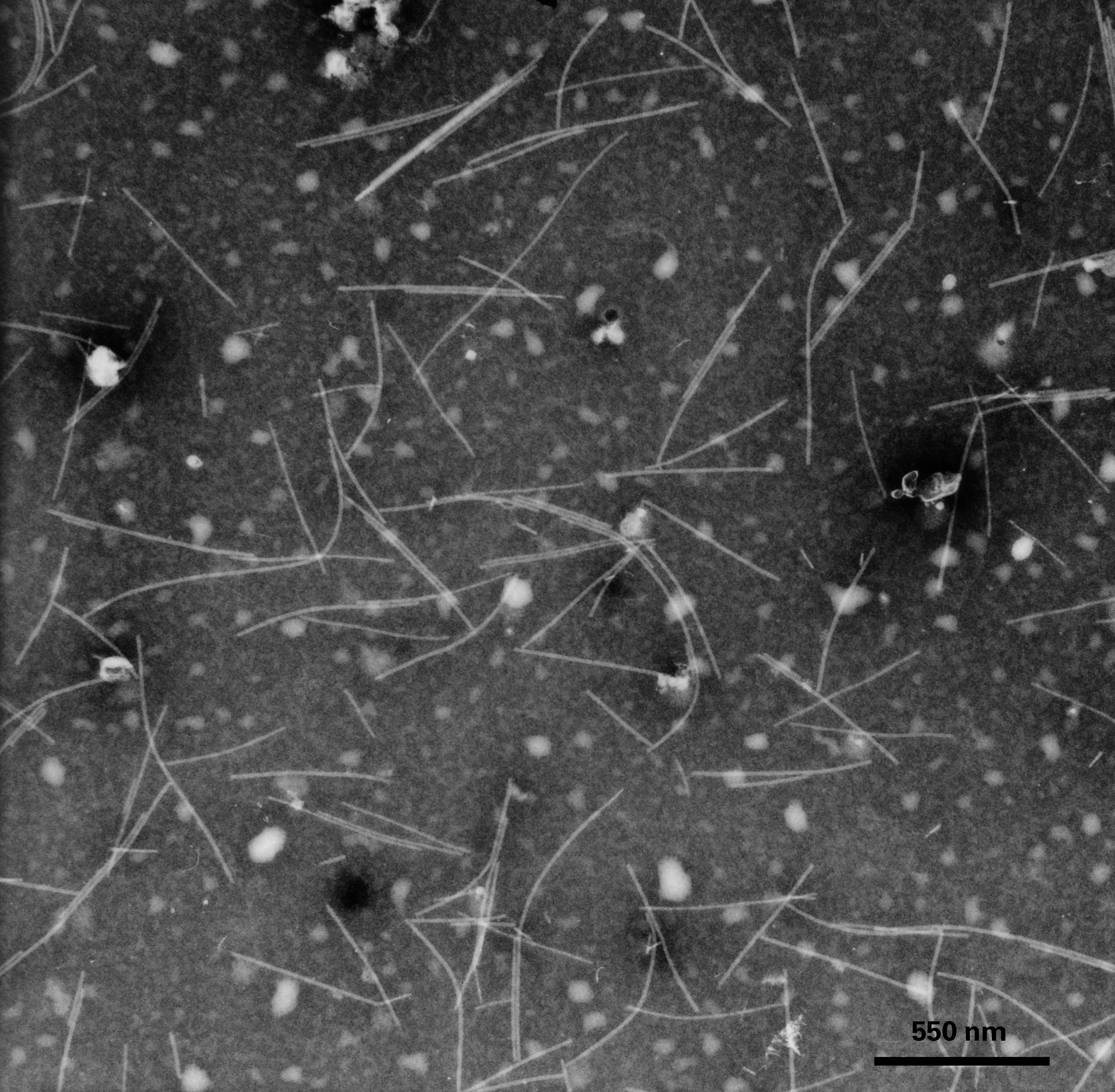
- Electron micrograph of narcissus mosaic virus (NMV) filamentous virions

Virus classification
- (unranked): Virus
- Realm: Riboviria
- Kingdom: Orthornavirae
- Phylum: Kitrinoviricota
- Class: Alsuviricetes
- Order: Tymovirales

Families
- Alphaflexiviridae; Betaflexiviridae; Deltaflexiviridae; Gammaflexiviridae; Tymoviridae

= Tymovirales =

Order of viruses

Tymovirales is an order of viruses with five families. The group consists of viruses which have positive-sense, single-stranded RNA genomes. Their genetic material is protected by a special coat protein.

== Description ==
Tymoviruses are mainly plant pathogens first described in 2004. They are characterised by similarities in their replication-associated polyproteins. These account for the majority of their genomic coding capacity. They are considered to form a group, phylogenetically, referred to as flexiviruses, with filamentous virions.

== Bibliography ==
- King, Andrew M. Q.; et al., eds. (2012). "Tymovirales". Virus taxonomy : classification and nomenclature of viruses : ninth report of the International Committee on Taxonomy of Viruses. London: Academic Press. p. 901. ISBN 978-0123846846.
