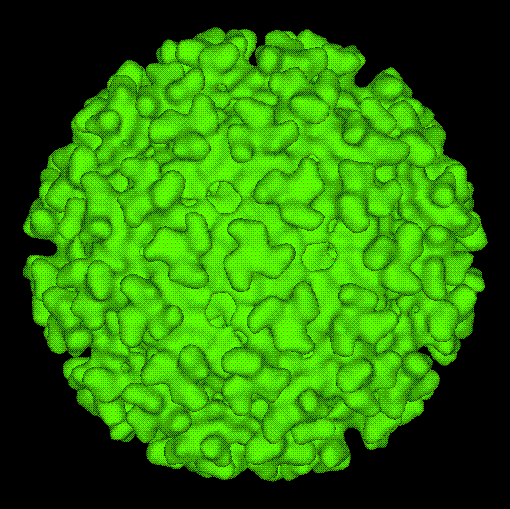
- Image of an Alphavirus Viral Structure. This exhibits the characteristic T=4 that MIDV also displays.

Virus classification
- (unranked): Virus
- Realm: Riboviria
- Kingdom: Orthornavirae
- Phylum: Kitrinoviricota
- Class: Alsuviricetes
- Order: Martellivirales
- Family: Togaviridae
- Genus: Alphavirus
- Species: Alphavirus middelburg

= Middelburg virus =

Species of virus

Middelburg virus (MIDV) is an alphavirus of the Old World Group that has likely endemic and zoonotic potential. It is of the viral family Togaviridae. It was isolated from mosquitos in 1957 in South Africa, MDIV antigens have now been found in livestock, horses, and humans.

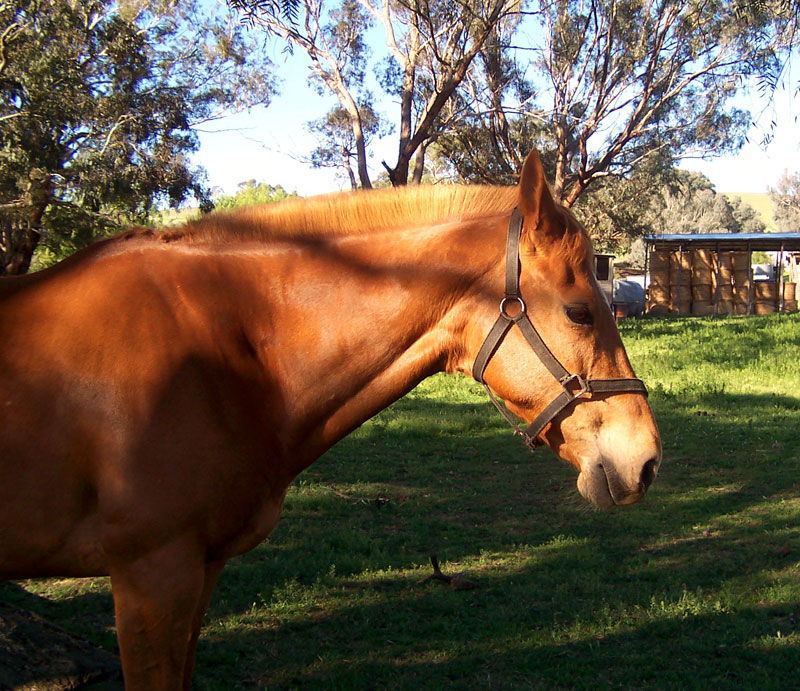
Image of a horse that could possibly be affected by MIDV.

== Symptoms ==
Typical symptoms of MIDV include: fever, swollen/aching limbs, hyperactivity, and depression. There is research suggesting that MIDV might cause neurologic disease. Some signs of the neurologic disease are: ataxia, paresis, seizures, and paralysis. In these cases where MIDV infection led to neurologic disease, moderate meningoencephalitis was observed microscopically. There have also been rare cases in horses where MIDV infection has led to jaundice, laminitic stance, and aborted pregnancy.

== Virus structure ==
Middelburg virus is a single stranded, linearly arranged, positive stranded RNA virus. MIDV has an enveloped capsid that contains an icosahedron structure. The icosahedron has a triangulation number (T) of 4, meaning it contains 240 monomers. It is thought to be part of the Semliki Forest clade of Alphaviridae

== Genome ==
A complete genomic sequence was made of the originally isolated MIDV-857 strand using a RT-qPCR method. Researchers found that the genome was 11,674 nucleotides long, not including the 5'-terminal cap or polyA-tail. They found that the 5'-terminal cap and polyA-tail fell between 180-220 residues. Through this sequencing, it was determined that MIDV has a similar structure and organization of its genome in comparison to other alphaviruses. MIDV possesses the same read-through stop codon between the genes nsP3 and nsP4, which is distinctive of alphaviruses. This same study found that the MIDV E1 gene was likely formed through recombination with Semliki Forest virus, or a virus very similar to SFV. The E1 gene is a membrane fusion protein that is important in viral entry and release. Together, E1 and E2 are the glycoproteins that make up the Alphavirus envelope over the nucleocapsid. A final finding of this study located a 112 nucleotide duplication in the 3' untranslated region (UTR) of the MIDV genome, implying that this virus is prone to duplication mutations. In a similar study, MIDV was found to have two open reading frames (ORFs). The first ORF encodes for nonstructural proteins, while the second ORF encodes the structural proteins like E1 and E2. It is important to know the sequencing to understand if certain strains act differently by causing different symptoms (i.e. only arthritis, only encephalitis, or both).

== Replication cycle ==
=== Entry ===
Alphaviruses, like MIDV, use receptor-mediated endocytic uptake to get into a host cell. Since no MIDV-specific cell entry literature could be found, the Alphavirus entry information that MIDV utilizes will be stated here. After being taken in through endocytosis, a low pH triggers a membrane fusion, which delivers the viral RNA genomes into the cell's cytoplasm. It is not yet know which surface molecule acts as an Alphavirus receptor, but research is looking at cell surface heparan sulfate (HS) as a viable receptor considering its close relation to the E2 protein found on the Alphavirus envelope. Research is also looking at DC-SIGN/L-SIGN as a receptor since it binds to mannose-rich carbohydrates that are often found in mosquitos, the vectors for Alphaviruses and MIDV. Alphaviruses utilize the clathrin-mediated endocytic pathway. Since presence of the Alphavirus does not have an effect on the number of clathrin-coated vesicles, it is assumed that the alphavirus takes advantage of the cells own processes without alteration. Research has found that this endocytic uptake of alphaviruses can be stopped through injection of anti-clathrin drugs - this could be utilized in the future to make a vaccine. After endocytic uptake, the virus is quickly delivered to the early endosome compartment, where a low pH then lyses the endosome and virus, exposing the cytoplasm to viral nucleocapsid. Cholesterol is also necessary for the Alphavirus to undergo fusion. This fusion of the endosomal membrane to the viral envelope allows the release of nucleocapsid into the cytoplasm of the host cell. Almost immediately the nucleocapsid is uncoated, exposing the viral RNA to the host cytoplasm

=== Replication and transcription ===
MIDV is a member of the family Togoviridae, which is hypothesized to use a "factory" replication process. The "factories" in this case, are the host cell's endosomes and lysosomes. The role of the endosome was explained above in the section on viral entry. The modified cellular lysosome creates a new vesicular structure termed the "cytopathic vacuole" (CPV) which can serve as a site for viral replication and possible transcription. The relationship between the CPV and RER are believed to create a viable site for translation of structural proteins and assembly of nucleocapsids of newly synthesized viruses. In replication, the (+)ssRNA genome is translated to make a polyprotein, which is in turn cleaved into the smaller structural proteins that are used in the replication and transcription of RNA. From the viral RNA, a double-stranded RNA (dsRNA) template is made. This dsRNA template then is transcribed and replicated, which is the new mRNA that is utilized for subsequent virus generations.

=== Assembly and release ===
The subgenomic RNA (sgRNA) that was made prior to this begins the next step in the life cycle of MIDV: assembly and release. The sgRNA codes for the structural proteins that will form the new virus. The assembly of the new viral capsid occurs in the cytoplasm. Finally, this newly synthesized capsid is enveloped by budding, a process that occurs when the virus exits the cells and is surrounded by the plasma membrane

== Possible Vectors ==
MIDV was first isolated from the mosquito species Ochlerotatus (Aedes) caballus, since then it has been found in other mosquito species in South Africa including: Aedes leneatopennis and Aedes albothorax. The virus is limited to Africa, but due to the wide range of these mosquito hosts and possible travelling of horses and livestock, there is cause to believe it might spread elsewhere. Sindbis virus, an extremely similar virus to MIDV has spread outside of Africa and effects humans. The horses themselves cannot act as vectors to spread MIDV since the concentration of virus in the host blood stream is too small to infect a mosquito.

Other host species include Ovis aries, Mansonia, and Aedes vittatus.

== Associated Disease ==
MIDV is classified as an Old World Alphavirus which also includes Semliki Forest virus (SFV), Ndumu virus, Barmah Forest virus, and the very well-known Chikungunya virus. These diseases all have similar symptoms: arthritis, fever, and rash. Current research is also pointing to Old World Alphaviruses leading to neurologic disease like their New World counterparts .

There is a similar group of Alphavirus known as the New World Alphaviruses that also share much in common with MIDV. These include: Eastern equine encephalitis (EEE) virus, and Venezuelan equine encephalitis virus. These viruses are more notoriously associated with neurologic disease and are more likely to effect humans.

== Tropism ==
There is no literature on MIDV tropism; based on the symptoms, it can be deduced that the virus mostly affects host connective tissue at the joints, causing arthritis. The virus also affects epithelial tissue in the form of a rash and nervous tissue in the form of encephalitis.

== Treatment ==
There is no known treatment for MIDV in horses currently. Veterinarians may give anti-inflammatory drugs to affected animals to lessen the inflammatory response of the infection. Horse owners can also take preemptive measure by using long-lasting repellants and mosquito netting.
