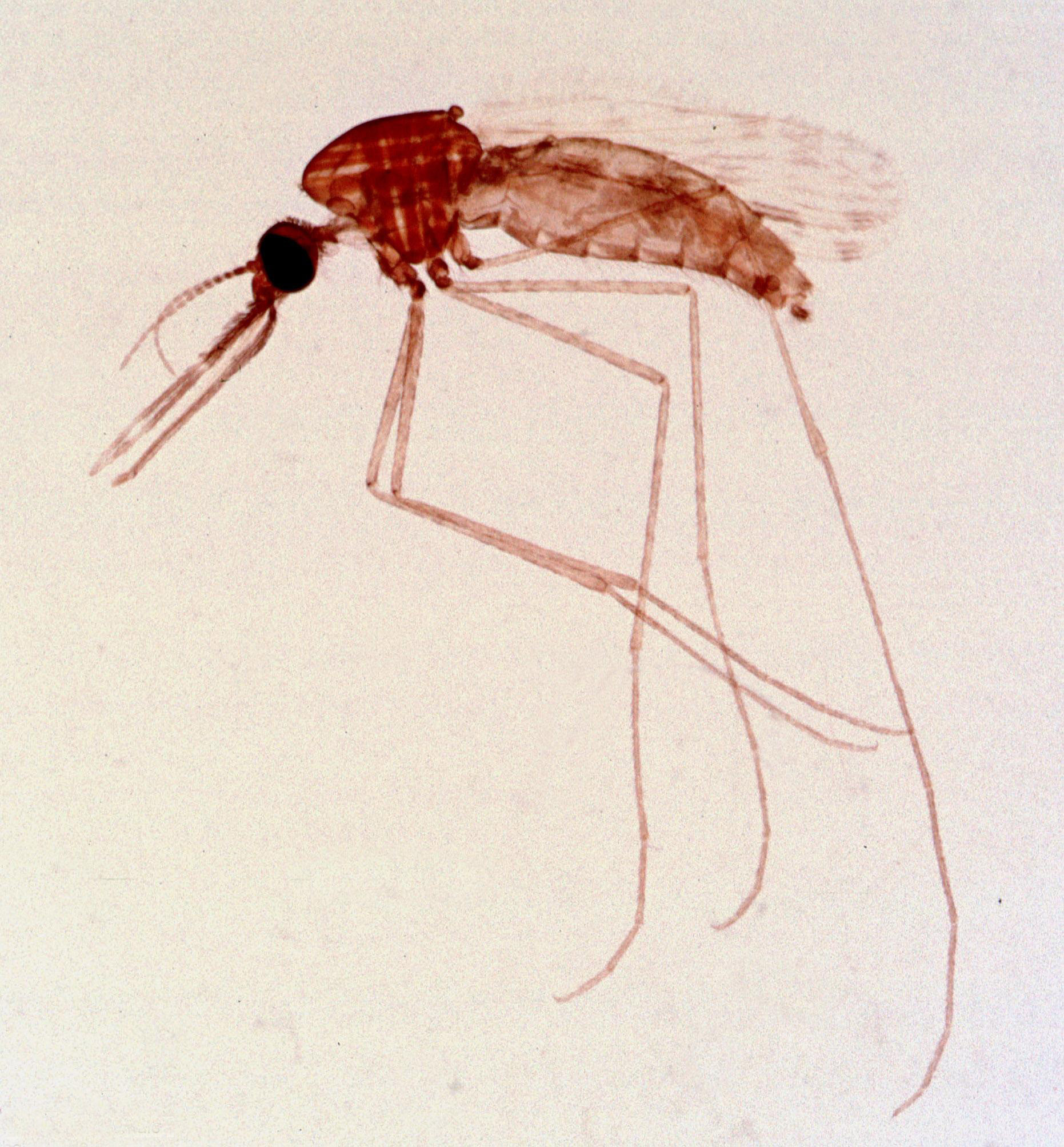

Virus classification
- (unranked): Virus
- Realm: Riboviria
- Kingdom: Orthornavirae
- Phylum: Kitrinoviricota
- Class: Alsuviricetes
- Order: Martellivirales
- Family: Togaviridae
- Genus: Alphavirus
- Species: Alphavirus eilat

= Eilat virus =

Species of virus

Eilat virus (EILV) is a unique Alphavirus which is known mainly for its host range restriction generally to insects (primarily to mosquitoes) by means of RNA replication. The virus is found in the Negev desert. It is incapable of infecting vertebrate cells, differentiating it from other alphaviruses.

== Virology ==
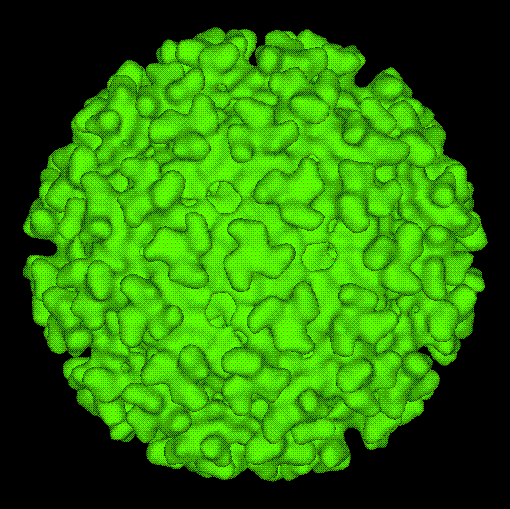
The structural form of an alphavirus.

Eilat virus is from the family Togaviridae, genus Alphavirus. Alphaviruses are miniature spherical shaped (around 70 nm in diameter) enveloped viruses that consist of a positive sense (5' to 3') RNA genome, which encompasses two ORF's (Open Reading Frame which is an incessant stretch of codons that do not contain a stop codon). Four nonstructural proteins are encoded on two-thirds of the genome (5' end), which include nsP1, nsP2, nsP3, nsP4. While five structural proteins ( sPs; Capsid, E1, E2, E3, and 6K) are encoded on the one third part of the genome ( 3' portion).

By receptor-mediated endocytosis, alphaviruses gain entry into a host cell. After acquiring access, the low endocytic pH allows for a conformational change that discloses an E1 fusion peptide. Thus, inducing the release of the nucleocapsid into the cytoplasm of the host cell. The nucleocapsids in turn aid in initiating virion budding from the host cell membrane.

== Discovery ==
Eilat virus was isolated during an arbovirus survey in the Negev desert between the years 1982 and 1984. However, it was initially obtained by Joseph Peleg from a pool of Anopheles coustani mosquitoes (from the isolates back in 1982). This specific isolation was performed in a study for over ninety-one identified viruses, and the EILV virus was found and isolated from the gut of the collected mosquitoes.

=== EILV location ===
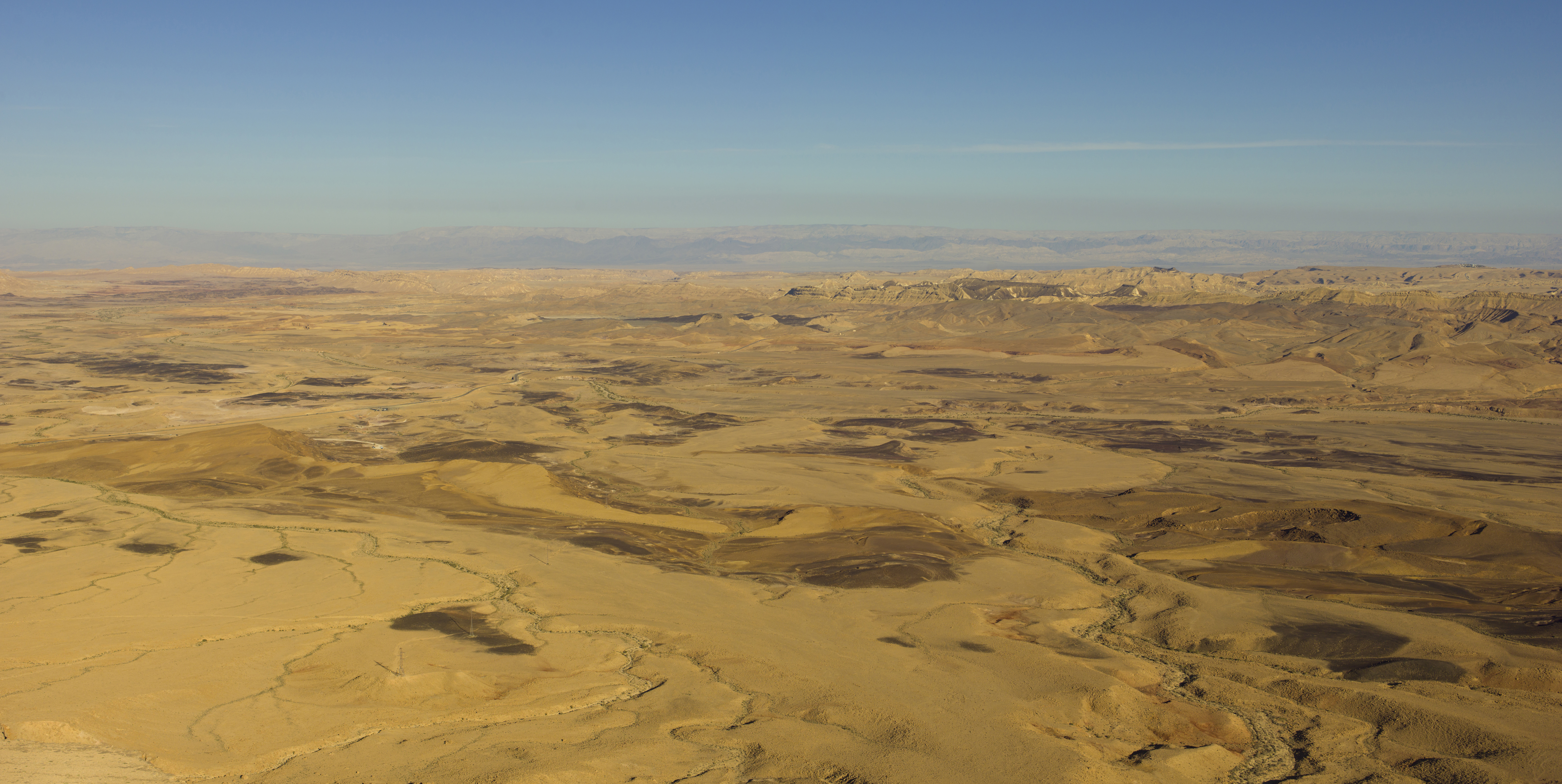
The Negev Desert is sparse in flora and fauna, but it is the "natural" home of the Eilat virus.

Eilat virus is located primarily in Africa and parts of the Middle East. It is found in regions where its natural vector (the Anopheles coustani) is situated. The place of its study however, plays an important role in the evolutionary significance of the EILV. The Negrev desert (being almost 13,000 km^{2}) is considered the natural area of the virus. The area's average climate ranges from the lowest being -5 °C to the highest of around 46 °C (yearly). The EILV was named after the city of Eilat which is located in the south area of the Negev desert (close to the region where the pool of Anopheles coustani's are located).

=== Evolutionary importance ===
Eilat virus shows an evolutionary change which may have occurred to alphaviruses. Normally, an alphavirus similar to that of the EILV would use mosquitoes as the vector of transmission to other (usually vertebrates) creatures. However, the Eilat virus can replicate consummately in an insect host and fails completely to even enter the cells of vertebrates. Based on experimental evidence when a relativity similar virus (SINV) was injected into vertebrate cell lines, the cells showed to have a great cytopathic effect. While when the same test was done on the EILV, the virus showed no cytopathic effect on the vertebrate cell lines. Therefore, evolutionary these results aid in suggesting that EILV lost its capability in infecting vertebrate cells. Thus, EILV appears to be mosquito-specific and represents a previously undescribed complex within the genus Alphavirus. Reverse genetic studies of EILV may help in the discovery of determinants of alphavirus host range which balances disease emergence.

== Areas of infection ==
When tested on four different mosquito species, Eilat virus had similar effects on certain organs of the mosquitos and did not infect other organs. This bar graph shows the percentage of the specified mosquito species infected by the EILV in several different organs of the host.

- Anterior mid-gut
- Posterior mid-gut
- Hindgut
- Salivary Glands
- Ovaries
- Malpighian Tubules

== Transmission ==
The virus's main hosts are mosquitoes, however it does have the ability to infect other insect cells. Eilat virus's incapability of entering vertebrate cells was proven by infection with the EILV-expressing red fluorescent protein which was obtained from a second genomic promoter. The red fluorescent protein was promptly observed in mosquito cells and unseen in vertebrate cells.

=== Oral transmission ===
Eilat virus is unable to infect its host in low doses orally. When a few species of mosquito were fed (a blood meal) containing Eilat virus in high doses, all test species did in fact get infected; however, when the dose range was lowered, the species would fail to get infected.

=== Venereal transmission ===
This virus (EILV) is typically transmitted sexually from one organism to another. This allows or aids Eilat virus to naturally keep its complex in circulation. However, researchers are still contemplating the fact that the virus was found to be unable to infect the ovaries, which would normally be a subsequent event following sexual transmittance in other alphaviruses.

== Related viruses ==
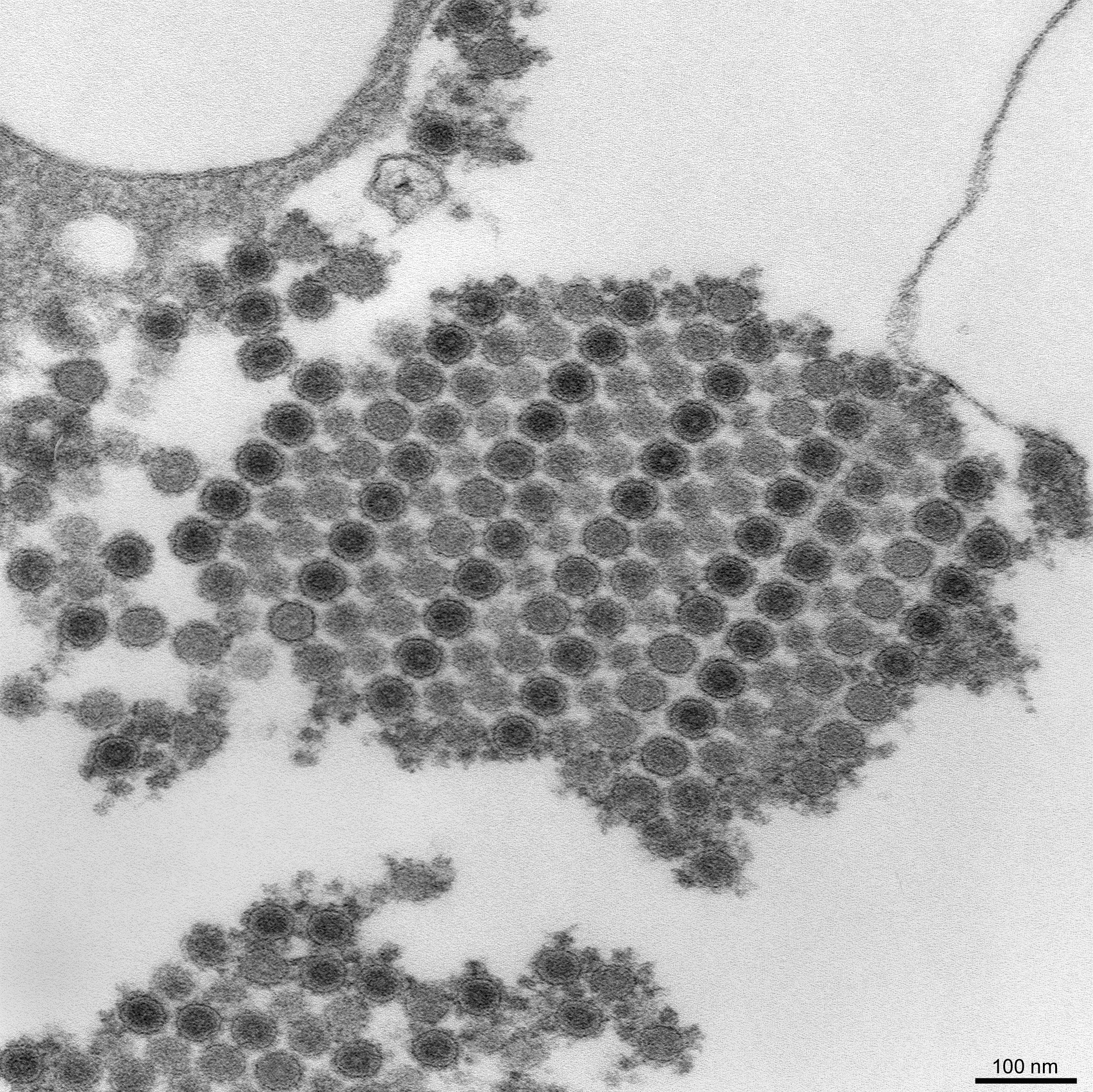
Chikungunya virus particles.

Though EILV is host specific (insect only), it is highly related to a series of viruses which have a more expansive host range. This relation assists in diagnostic testing with the vertebrate infecting viruses. Researchers discovered that the structural proteins of the EILV can be replaced by those of (pathogenic to mammals) related viruses (by super infection exclusion/ Homologous interference). This in turn will allow the virus to form a virus, (of broader host ranges), look alike to the immune system. Therefore, helping the immune system recognize these harmful viruses. Researchers at the University of Texas Medical Branch used this concept for the Chikungunya virus by creating the UTMB test. This test aids in clinical diagnoses and is an affordable alternative to the use of inactivated viruses in diagnostic testing.

Viruses	Abbreviation	Similarities to EILV
Whataroa virus	WHATV	Similarity in lengths of UTR's (untranslated regions on mRNA) and intergenic regions.; Nucleotide and amino acid sequence similarity ( 57%); Completely identical E1 fusion peptide; High similarity to nonstructural and structural protein cleavage sites
Sindbis virus	SINV	Similarity in lengths of UTR's and intergenic regions; Nucleotide and amino acid sequence similarity (56%); Significant similarity to E1 fusion peptide; High similarity to nonstructural and structural protein cleavage sites; High similarity to ribosomal binding sites sequences
Trocara virus	TROV	Similarity in lengths of UTR's and intergenic regions; Nucleotide and amino acid sequence similarity (53%); High similarity to nonstructural and structural protein cleavage sites
Aura virus	AURAV	Similarity in lengths of UTR's and intergenic regions; Nucleotide and amino acid sequence similarity (55%); High similarity to ribosomal binding site sequences; High similarity to nonstructural and structural protein cleavage sites
Western equine encephalitis virus	WEEV	Similarity in lengths of UTR's and intergenic regions; Nucleotide and amino acid sequence similarity (52%); Significant similarity to E1 fusion peptide
Eastern equine encephalitis virus	EEEV	Similarity in lengths of UTR's and intergenic regions; Nucleotide and amino acid sequence similarities (51%); Significant similarity to E1 fusion peptide
Salmon pancreas disease virus	SPDV	Similarity in lengths of UTR's and intergenic regions; Nucleotide and amino acid sequence similarities (43%)
Venezuelan equine encephalitis virus	VEEV	Similarity in lengths of UTR's and intergenic regions; Nucleotide and amino acid sequence similarities (51%); Significant similarity to E1 fusion peptide
Chikungunya virus	CHIKV	Similarity in lengths of UTR's and intergenic regions; Nucleotide and amino acid sequence similarities (52%); Significant similarity to E1 fusion peptide

== Anopheles coustani's aid in natural maintenance ==
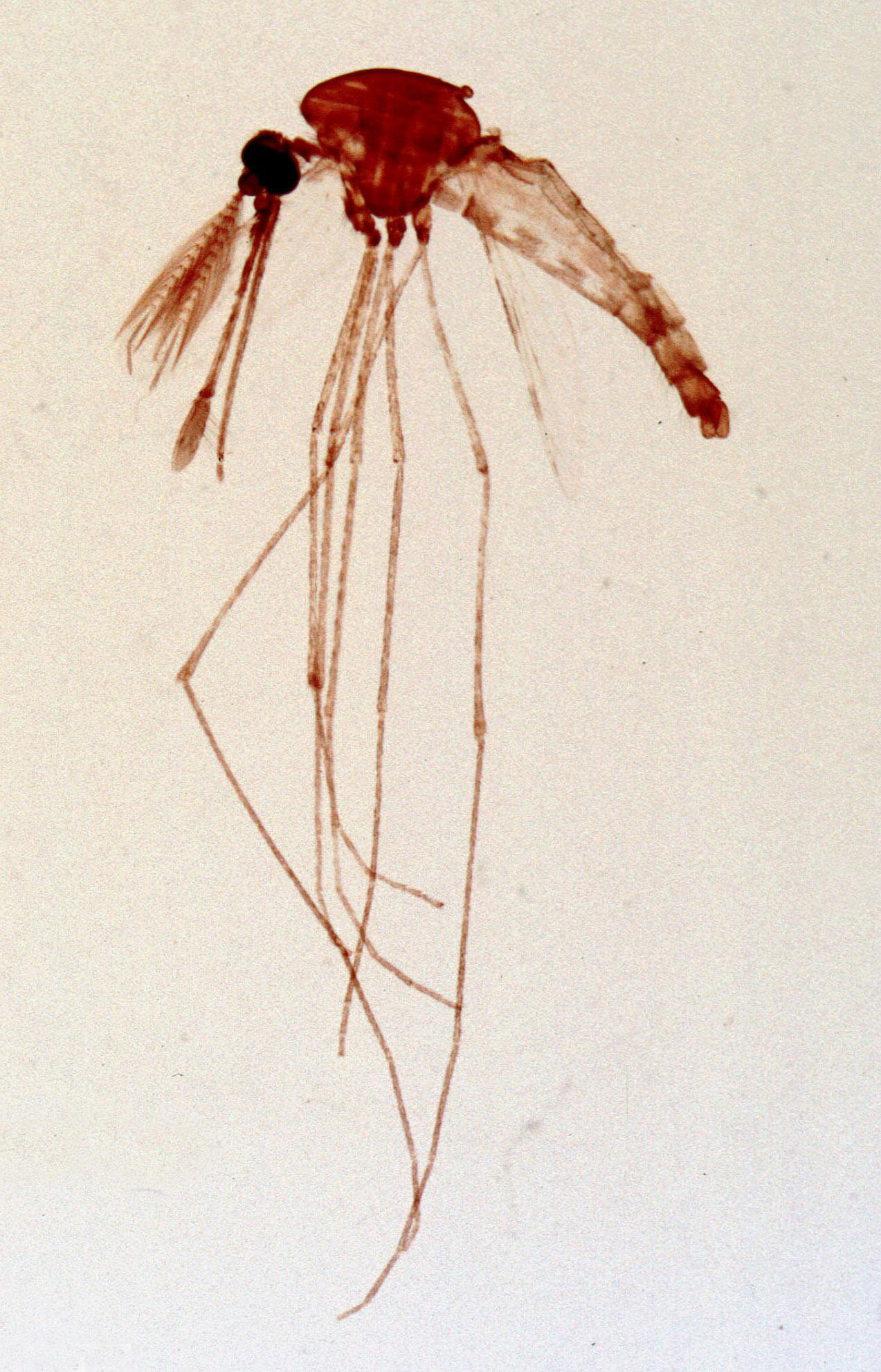
Anopheles are the prime natural vectors for Eilat virus. They are also secondary vectors for the malaria virus.

Eilat virus was first isolated from the specified species Anopheles coustani (mosquito species) located at the Negev desert. Though this virus was identified and labeled in the late 1980s, research began on it starting in the early 2000s. Since this mosquito species was the prime victim of the EILV it is thought to be the top factor in naturally maintaining the virus. Anopheles coustani may in fact be the only mosquito species which is a natural conservative for the EILV. This would make the EILV be the second alphavirus which is able to employ an Anopheles species as a natural vector. This mosquito species is also a secondary vector for the malaria virus and is located in regions of the Middle East and Africa.

== Significance ==
EILV has a limited and restricted host range. It being the only alphavirus (mosquito-borne) which is unable to infect mammalian and other vertebrate cells indicates a quick evolutionary change that was done by an Alphavirus. The EILV is not just restricted to the genomic RNA replication level but it also is unable to gain entry into vertebrate cells. Therefore, with further study the Eilat virus can compensate in making clear the viral factors other pathogenic similar viruses have in obtaining a broader host range. Also, it makes a possible candidate in promoting vaccine development for other alphaviruses with the ability to infect vertebrate cells. However, since research on Eilat virus has only recently been put into action, there is still much more to be gained (evolutionary, medically, and scientifically) from this unique mosquito-borne alphavirus.

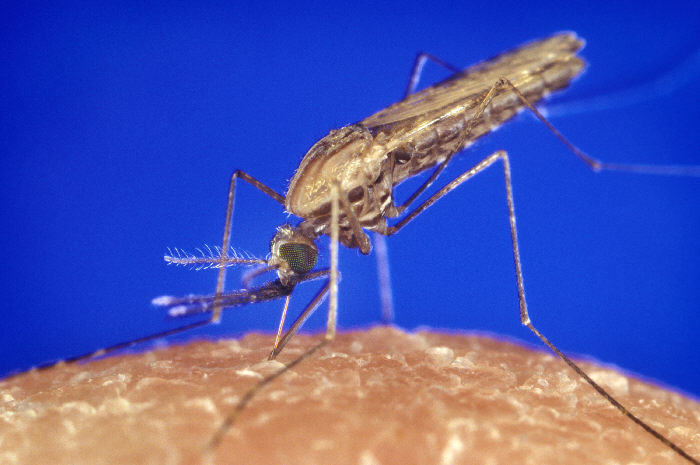
Anopheles gambiae was only able to get infected by the EILV in the posterior mid-gut.
