= Mayaro virus disease =

Mosquito-borne viral disease

Mayaro virus disease is a mosquito-borne zoonotic pathogen endemic to certain humid forests of tropical South America. Infection with Mayaro virus causes an acute, self-limited dengue-like illness of 3–5 days' duration. The causative virus, Mayaro virus (MAYV), is in the family Togaviridae, and genus Alphavirus. It is closely related to other alphaviruses that produce a dengue-like illness accompanied by long-lasting arthralgia. It is only known to circulate in tropical South America.

== Virology ==
Mayaro virus

Virus classification
- (unranked): Virus
- Realm: Riboviria
- Kingdom: Orthornavirae
- Phylum: Kitrinoviricota
- Class: Alsuviricetes
- Order: Martellivirales
- Family: Togaviridae
- Genus: Alphavirus
- Species: Alphavirus mayaro

Mayaro virus has a structure similar to other alphaviruses. It is an enveloped virus and has an icosahedral capsid with a diameter of 70 nm. The virus genome is composed of a linear, positive-sense, single-stranded RNA with 11,429 nucleotides, excluding the 5’ cap nucleotide and 3’ poly(A) tail.

The MAYV RNA genome contains the 5' untranslated region, 3' noncoding region, and two open reading frames (ORFs). The 5' proximal and 3' proximal ORFs are separated by a short, noncoding sequence and represent two-thirds and one-third of the genomic RNA, respectively. The 5’-proximal ORF codes for a polyprotein that after cleavage forms nonstructural proteins (nsP1, nsP2, nsP3, nsP4) and the 3’-proximal ORF with a 26S promoter codes for a polyprotein that is cleaved into structural proteins to generate capsid proteins and envelope surface glycoproteins (E1, E2, E3, C, 6K).

The nonstructural proteins (nsP) play different functions in the virus cycle. The nsP1 is an mRNA-capping enzyme, nsP2 has protease activity, and nsP4 is a RNA-direct RNA polymerase. The structural polyprotein is cleaved into six chains: capsid protein (C), p62, E3 protein or spike glycoprotein E3, E2 envelope glycoprotein or spike glycoprotein E2, 6K protein, and E1 envelope glycoprotein known also as spike glycoprotein E1. The envelope lipid component is critical for virus particle stability and infectivity in mammalian cells Once the virus enters into the host cell, the genomic RNA is released into the cytoplasm, where the two ORFs are translated into proteins and the synthesis of negative-stranded RNA starts. A consecutive synthesis of positive-stranded RNA takes place.

The MAYV sequences analysis showed two genotypes (D and L). The amplicon used for phylogenetic analysis includes E1 and E2 glycoprotein genes and the 3' NCR. The genotype D is distributed in Trinidad, Brazil, French Guiana, Surinam, Peru, and Bolivia, while the genotype L is limited to the north-central region of Brazil.

== Diagnosis ==
The MAYV infection is characterized by fever, headache, myalgia, rash, prominent pain in the large joints, and association with rheumatic disease, but these signs and symptoms are unspecific to distinguish from other arboviruses. The MAYV infection can be confirmed by laboratory testing such as virus isolation, RT-PCR, and serology. The virus isolation in cell culture is effective during viremia. RT-PCR helps to identify virus. Serology tests detect antibodies like IgM and the most common assay is IgM-capture enzyme-linked immunosorbant assays (ELISA). This test usually requires a consecutive retest to confirm increasing titers. While the IgG detection is applied for epidemiology studies.

== Epidemiology ==
The virus's transmission cycle in the wild is similar to the continuous sylvatic cycle of yellow fever, and is believed to involve wild primates (monkeys) as the natural reservoir and the tree canopy-dwelling Haemagogus species mosquito as the vector. Human infections are strongly associated with exposure to humid tropical forest environments. Chikungunya virus is closely related, producing a nearly indistinguishable, highly debilitating arthralgic disease.

On February 19, 2011, a Portuguese-language news source reported on a recent survey that revealed Mayaro virus activity in Manaus, Amazonas State, Brazil. The survey studied blood samples from 600 residents of Manaus who had experienced a high fever; Mayaro virus was identified in 33 cases. Four of the cases experienced mild hemorrhagic (bleeding) symptoms, which had not previously been described in Mayaro virus disease. The report stated that this outbreak is the first detected in a metropolitan setting.

A study published in 1991 demonstrated that a colonized strain of Brazilian Aedes albopictus was capable of acquiring MAYV from infected hamsters and subsequently transmitting it, and another study demonstrated that A. aegypti can transmit MAYV, supporting the possibility of wider transmission of Mayaro virus disease in urban settings.

A 2018 study demonstrated that A. aegypti and Culex quinquefasciatus were inefficient MAYV vectors, but Anopheles freeborni, Anopheles gambiae, Anopheles quadrimaculatus, and Anopheles stephensi were able to transmit MAYV, with three of the four capable of transmitting two genotypes. The tested Anopheles species are native to Africa, Asia, and North America, suggesting that Anopheles spp. could play a significant role in the dissemination and establishment of MAYV in diverse regions of the world.

== Recent cases ==
An outbreak in Chuquisaca Department, Bolivia, involving 12 persons, was reported in May 2007.

In January 2010, a French tourist developed high-grade fever and severe joint pain manifestations following a 15-day trip in the Amazon basin, Brazil, and was diagnosed with MAYV infection in France. This case is the first reported in a traveler returning from an endemic South American country to Europe. Mayaro virus disease has also been transported into the United States by two visitors infected in eastern Peru and into the Netherlands by a couple infected while vacationing in Suriname.

The first outbreak of Mayaro virus disease in humans in Venezuela was reported in early June 2010, with 69 cases diagnosed in Ospino, Portuguesa state, and an additional two in San Fernando de Apure, Apure state, on 7 June 2010, for a total of 71 reported cases as of 8 June.

A single case of Mayaro virus in a child in Haiti in 2015 has been confirmed.

In 2019, cases were reported in Peru and Ecuador.

== Treatment ==
Research has suggested that macrophage migration inhibitory factor plays a critical role in determining the clinical severity of alphavirus-induced musculoskeletal disease and may provide a target for development of antiviral pharmaceuticals for Mayaro virus and other alphaviruses that affect human beings, such as Ross River virus, chikungunya, Sindbis virus, and O'nyong'nyong virus.
