= Babanki virus =

Virus classification
- (unranked): Virus
- Realm: Riboviria
- Kingdom: Orthornavirae
- Phylum: Kitrinoviricota
- Class: Alsuviricetes
- Order: Martellivirales
- Family: Togaviridae
- Genus: Alphavirus
- Species: Sindbis virus
- Virus: Babanki virus

Species of virus

Babanki virus (BBKV) is a member of the virus family Togaviridae of Class IV of the Baltimore classification system and the genus Alphavirus.

== Genome and Structure ==
It has an unsegmented, positive sense, single-stranded RNA genome which is approximately 11.7kb long. In general, members of the Togaviridae have genomes which are able to be used directly as mRNA and the genome of BBKV can code for both structural and non-structural proteins. Currently, the genome of BBKV has only been partially sequenced. It has a spherical nucleocapsid which is approximately 40 nm in diameter and shows icosahedral symmetry of T=4. This nucleocapsid core is surrounded by a lipid envelope covered with glycoprotein spikes and virion particles are approximately 70 nm in diameter in total.

== Disease ==
BBKV was first isolated in Babanki in Northwest Cameroon, Africa in 1969 and the disease is also known in Senegal and Madagascar. It is closely related to another Alphavirus, Sindbis virus and causes similar symptoms in humans like fever, arthralgia or joint pain and a rash. It is spread by an arthropod vector, typically mosquitoes of the genus Culex, Aedes, or Mansonia. Its normal reservoir is birds.
