= Rio Negro virus =

Virus classification
- (unranked): Virus
- Realm: Riboviria
- Kingdom: Orthornavirae
- Phylum: Kitrinoviricota
- Class: Alsuviricetes
- Order: Martellivirales
- Family: Togaviridae
- Genus: Alphavirus
- Species: Alphavirus negro

Species of virus

Rio Negro virus is an alphavirus that was first isolated in Argentina in 1980. The virus was first called Ag80-663 but was renamed to Rio Negro virus in 2005. Closely related viruses include Mucambo virus and Everglades virus.

== Structure ==
Rio Negro virus is a spherical, enveloped virus. The complete virus particle, called a virion, leaves the host cell by budding and using a part of its host cell's membrane as the envelope. On the surface of the envelope are proteins that attach to receptors on the surface of cells. There are 80 'spikes' embedded in the stolen membrane, which are arranged in a T=4 icosahedral symmetry. In all, the Rio Negro virion is about 70 nanometers (nm) in diameter with 3 structural proteins making up the capsid. There are 2 open reading frames (ORF) on the genome. The proteins (E1, E2, and C) are encoded in the C-terminal ORF near the 3' end while the non-structural proteins (nsPs 1-4) are encoded in the N-terminal ORF the 5' end. The E1 and the E2 proteins are used to make up the base of the protrusions that interact between the capsid and the membrane.

== Viral genome ==
The virus has a positive-sense, single-stranded RNA (+ssRNA) genome that is 11.5 kilobases in length. It encodes an RNA-dependent RNA polymerase (RdRp). The Rio Negro genome is a non-segmented genome, meaning that to make copies or proteins, the whole genome must be translated to get a specific part. These are then broken up into sub-genomic proteins, which encode the structural proteins. The genome and the sub-genome have 5' caps and poly(A) tails.

== Transmission ==
The main vector of transmission for Rio Negro is mosquitoes and rodents. There are seven mosquitoes that have been scientifically shown to be carriers of the Rio Negro virus. The species with the most evidence of infection were the Culex interfor, Culex quinquefasciatus, Aedes albifasciatus, and Culex (Melanoconion) taeniopus.

== Viral replication cycle ==
=== Entry ===
Rio Negro virus, like all alphaviruses, has glycoprotein receptors, called E proteins, on its envelope. which recognize cellular receptors in order to perform membrane fusion. On the viral envelope, there are originally two of these glycoprotein receptors, P62 and E1, which form a dimer. P62 is eventually cleaved into E2 and E3 proteins, forming a trimer, and this prepares these proteins to be reactive to acidic conditions. Membrane fusion is initiated by receptor recognition, followed by clathrin-mediated endocytosis. Then, in response to the low pH of the endosome, an irreversible change in the conformation of the glycoprotein trimer occurs. The E2 protein's cytoplasmic domain interacts with the nucleocapsid of the virus, while its ectodomain binds to receptors on the surface of the host membrane. When the E2 protein binds to host receptors, the virus is engulfed into the host via endocytosis. Once the virus is in a cellular endosome, with low pH, the E1 and E2 proteins disassociate. This conformational change exposes the viruses' fusion peptides, which then fuse the membrane of the virus and the cellular endosome, which transports the nucleocapsid of the virus into the cytoplasm of the host cell.

=== Genome replication ===
After membrane fusion, the genome of Rio Negro virus enters the host's cytoplasm, and this is where replication and transcription occur. The viral genomic +ssRNA is used both to translate proteins and to transcribe (+)ssRNA copies of the viral genome. The viral genome has two ORFs which generate the nonstructural and structural polyproteins. There are five structural proteins - C, E3, E2, 6K, and E1 - as well as the nonstructural polyprotein - nsP1-4. Rio Negro virus, as a type of alphavirus, encodes four nonstructural proteins (nsP1-4) in its genome that are used in RNA synthesis. These are initially produced as a polyprotein, but are later cleaved by viral or host proteases, to form separate polyproteins. The first cleavage produces polyprotein P123 and nsP4, and these form a negative sense ssRNA (-ssRNA) template strand to be used to replicate the viral genome. Then, the P123 polyprotein is further cleaved to form nsP1, nsP2, and nsP3 proteins, in addition to nsP4. These produce +ssRNA copies of the viral genome, using the -ssRNA strand as a template, that will later be distributed to the virions which will be released after assembly. The RdRp is capable of de novo RNA synthesis.

=== Assembly and release ===
Alphavirus nucleocapsids are assembled in the cytoplasm from the capsid proteins produced in translation of the viral genome. Alphavirus virions are composed of the lipid envelope in which the E2 and E1 glycoproteins are located, and the nucleocapsid, composed of the capsid protein, which surrounds the genome. The capsid proteins have two domains: the C-terminal protease domain and the N-terminal domain, which has a strong positive charge. The protease function of the C-terminal serves to cleave the capsid protein from the polyprotein in which it was produced, so that it can separate to form the capsid.

The viral genome contains conserved regions that serve as packaging signals, which increase the efficiency of viral packaging. One of these packaging signals is in the nsP1 coding sequence in the Venezuelan, Eastern, and Western equine encephalitis viruses. This area of the genome forms eight stem loops. Each of these loops contain triplet guanine (GGG) nucleotides at the stem tip. When the nucleocapsid of the virus is assembled, encapsulating the newly produced viral genome, it exits the cell by budding through the plasma membrane. This is also where virus-encoded surface glycoprotein E1 and E2 are assimilated onto the virion.

== Host interactions ==
The virus capsid and de novo viral gene expression is needed to shut down STAT1 creation. Not only that, research shows that VEEC viruses don't seem to be affected by some of the cell's defenses, mainly type I and II IFNs.

== Tropism ==
Infection in humans and horses are different. In horses, the virus attacks the central nervous system, causing paralysis and eventual death. When the virus infects humans, symptoms manifest as fever, chills, headaches, nausea, vomiting, and muscle and back pain. Humans tend to recover in a few weeks, during which severe symptoms are limited to the first couple days. The case fatality rate for human adults is only 1%, but it is much higher in children, rising to 20%. Horses have a 10% chance of dying from infection. Like most virus infections, there is the normal collection of flu-like symptoms from the immune system fighting back. There is a 4–14% chance of neurological complications developing from infection. Death is usually caused by encephalitis and bleeding in the brain, lungs, or intestines.
