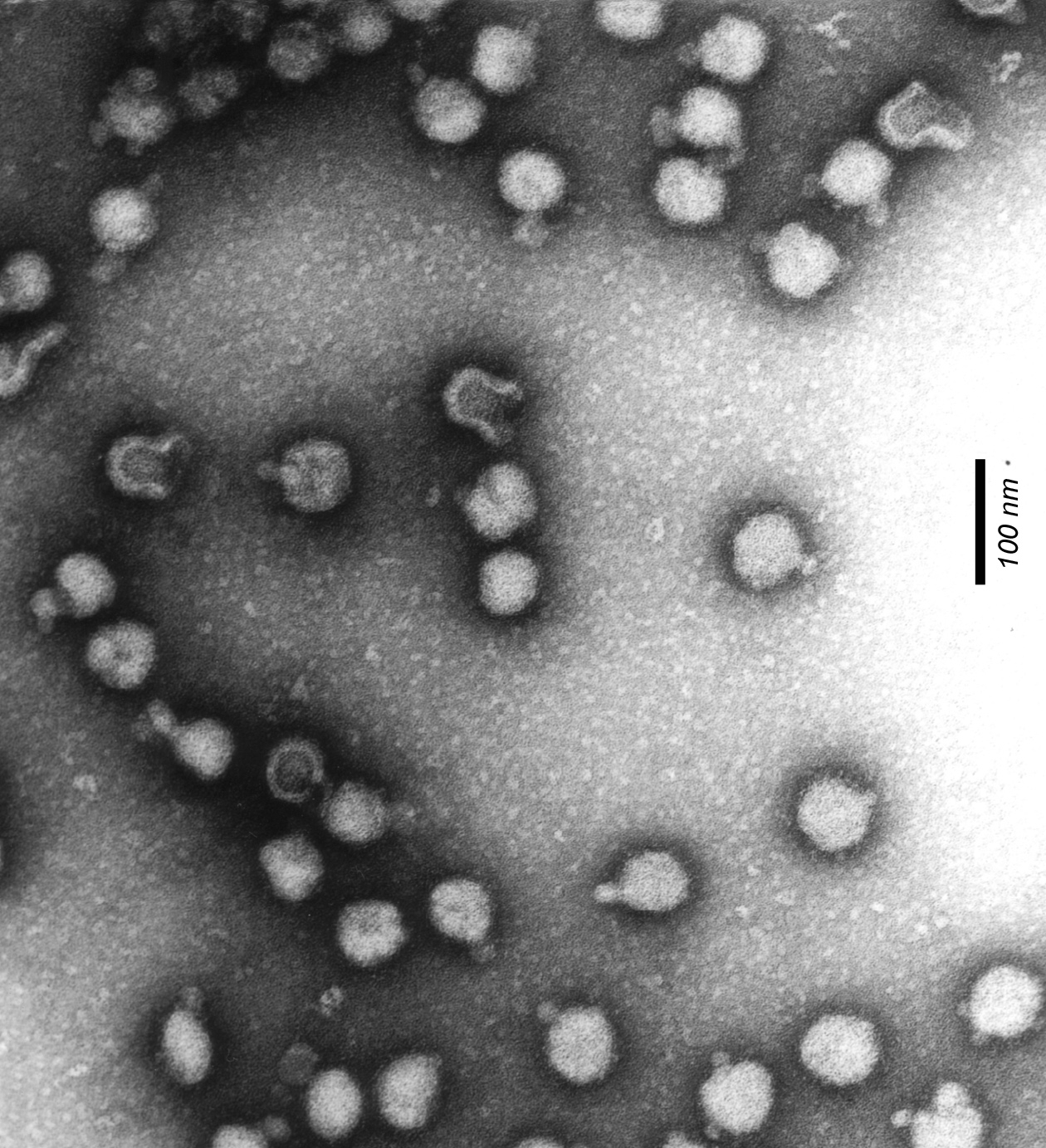

Virus classification
- (unranked): Virus
- Realm: Riboviria
- Kingdom: Orthornavirae
- Phylum: Kitrinoviricota
- Class: Alsuviricetes
- Order: Martellivirales
- Family: Togaviridae
- Genus: Alphavirus
- Species: Alphavirus semliki

= Semliki Forest virus =

Species of virus

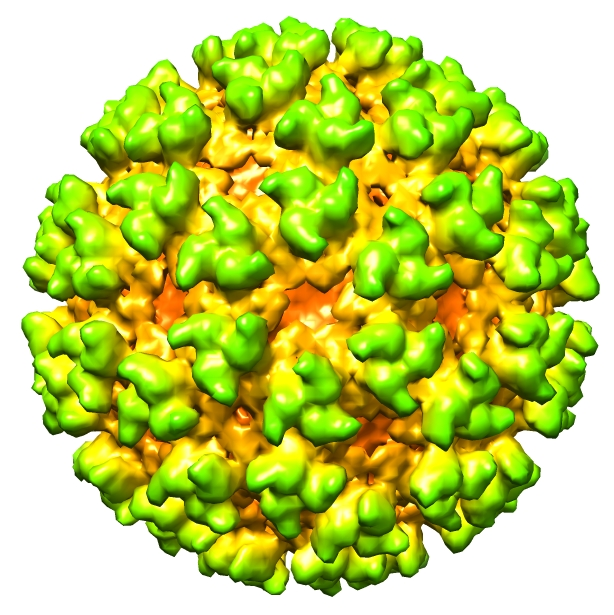
Cryo-electron microscopy reconstruction of Semliki Forest virus at 9Å resolution (EMDB entry EMD-1015)

Semliki Forest virus is an alphavirus found in central, eastern, and southern Africa. It was first isolated from mosquitoes in the Semliki Forest, Uganda by the Uganda Virus Research Institute in 1942 and described by Smithburn and Haddow. It is known to cause disease in animals and humans.

The Semliki Forest virus is a positive-strand RNA virus with a genome of approximately 13,000 base pairs which encodes nine proteins. The 5’ two thirds of the genome encode four non-structural proteins concerned with RNA synthesis; the structural proteins are encoded in the 3’ one third. Of the structural proteins, the C proteins make up the icosahedral capsid, which is enveloped by a lipid bilayer derived from the host cell. The outermost surface of the virus is almost entirely covered by heterodimers of glycoproteins E1 and E2, arranged in interconnective trimers, which form an outer shell. Trimers are anchored in the membrane by an E2 cytoplasmic domain that associates with the nucleocapsid.

Replication occurs via a negative strand intermediate giving rise to a full-length genomic RNA for export in new virions and a subgenomic message that is translated into the structural proteins.

Semliki Forest virus is spread mainly by mosquito bites. It is not able to infect mammals through inhalation or gastrointestinal exposure, although rodents in the laboratory can be infected by intranasal instillation. The virus is able to cause a lethal encephalitis in rodents, but generally only mild symptoms in humans. Only one lethal human infection has been reported. In this one case, the patient was speculated to be immunodeficient and potentially had been exposed to large amounts of virus in the laboratory.

Semliki Forest virus has been used extensively in biological research as a model of the viral life cycle and of viral neuropathy. Due to its broad host range and efficient replication, it has also been developed as a vector for genes encoding vaccines and anti-cancer agents, and as a tool in gene therapy.

Since Semliki Forest virus naturally infects cells of the central nervous system, it has been pre-clinically tested as an oncolytic virus against the very aggressive brain tumour type glioblastoma. The virus was genetically modified with microRNA target sequences so that it only replicated in brain tumour cells and not in normal brain cells. The modified virus reduced tumour growth and prolonged survival of mice with brain tumours. The modified virus was also found to efficiently kill human glioblastoma tumour cell lines.

External videos
- Semliki Forest virus entry. 3 min.

== See also ==
- Alphavirus
- Sindbis virus
- Chikungunya
