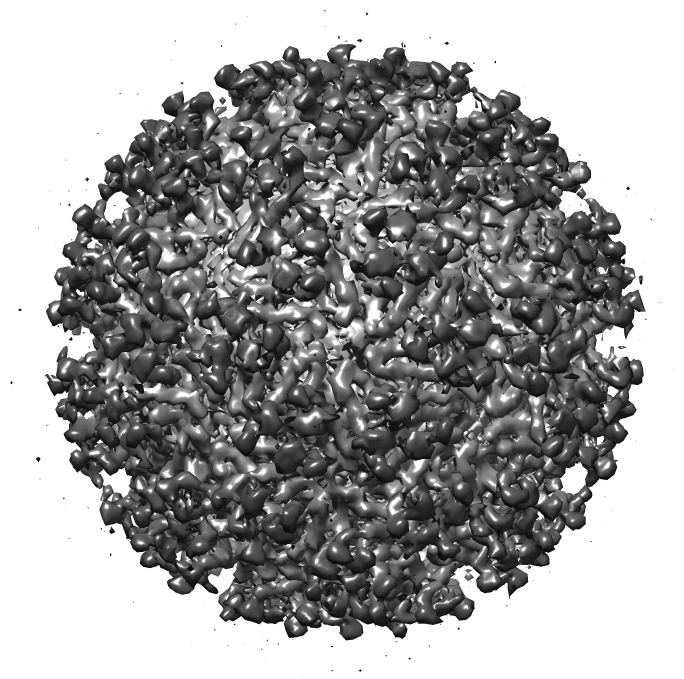
- CryoEM reconstruction of the Everglades Virus. EMDB entry EMD-5563

Virus classification
- (unranked): Virus
- Realm: Riboviria
- Kingdom: Orthornavirae
- Phylum: Kitrinoviricota
- Class: Alsuviricetes
- Order: Martellivirales
- Family: Togaviridae
- Genus: Alphavirus
- Species: Alphavirus everglades

= Everglades virus =

Species of virus

Everglades virus (EVEV) is an alphavirus included in the Venezuelan equine encephalitis virus complex. The virus circulates among rodents and vector mosquitoes and sometimes infects humans, causing a febrile illness with occasional neurological manifestations. Although it is said to be rare in humans it is still debated if this is the case because of the possibility of underdiagnosing as well as being a unrecognized cause of other illnesses. The virus is named after the Everglades, a region of subtropical wetlands in southern Florida. The virus is endemic to the U.S. state of Florida, where its geographic range mirrors that of the mosquito species Culex cedecei. Hispid cotton rat and cotton mouse are considered important reservoir hosts of Everglades virus. Most clinical cases of infection occur in and around the city of Miami. The abundance in clinical cases in certain parts of Florida comes from many factors such as population density and proximity to the hosts and their ecosystem.

== Signs and symptoms ==
Symptoms of infection include:

- Enlarged, tender lymph nodes
- Fever
- Headache
- Malaise
- Myalgia
- Pharyngitis

== Transmission ==
The virus is transmitted by the bite of infected mosquitoes of the genus Culex, specifically Culex cedecei.
