= PARP7 =

Enzyme found in humans

TIPARP

Identifiers
- Aliases: TIPARP, ARTD14, PARP7, pART14, TCDD inducible poly(ADP-ribose) polymerase
- External IDs: OMIM: 612480; MGI: 2159210; GeneCards: TIPARP

Gene location (Human)
Chr.	Chromosome 3 (human)
Band	3q25.31	Start	156,673,235 bp
Band	3q25.31	End	156,706,770 bp

Gene location (Mouse)
Chr.	Chromosome 3 (mouse)
Band	3|3 E1	Start	65,435,831 bp
Band	3|3 E1	End	65,462,939 bp
RNA expression pattern
Bgee	Human / Mouse (ortholog); Top expressed in: secondary oocyte; skin of thigh; vena cava; tail of epididymis; caput epididymis; Achilles tendon; mucosa of urinary bladder; mucosa of pharynx; urethra; palpebral conjunctiva / Top expressed in: zygote; secondary oocyte; primary oocyte; epithelium of lens; sciatic nerve; medial ganglionic eminence; spermatocyte; tail of embryo; transitional epithelium of urinary bladder; decidua; More reference expression data
BioGPS	More reference expression data
Gene ontology
Molecular function	transferase activity; glycosyltransferase activity; metal ion binding; NAD+ ADP-ribosyltransferase activity; protein ADP-ribosylase activity
Cellular component	nucleus
Biological process	roof of mouth development; protein ADP-ribosylation; positive regulation of protein catabolic process; estrogen metabolic process; androgen metabolic process; kidney development; skeletal system morphogenesis; cellular response to organic cyclic compound; post-embryonic development; negative regulation of gene expression; female gonad development; vasculogenesis; nitrogen compound metabolic process; smooth muscle tissue development; platelet-derived growth factor receptor signaling pathway; face morphogenesis; hemopoiesis; response to 2,3,7,8-tetrachlorodibenzodioxine; protein auto-ADP-ribosylation; protein mono-ADP-ribosylation
Sources:Amigo / QuickGO
Orthologs
Databases	NCBI: entry; OMA: entry
Species	Human	Mouse
Entrez	25976	99929
Ensembl	ENSG00000163659	ENSMUSG00000034640
UniProt	Q7Z3E1	Q8C1B2
RefSeq (mRNA)	NM_001184717; NM_001184718; NM_015508	NM_178892
RefSeq (protein)	NP_001171646; NP_001171647; NP_056323	NP_849223
Location (UCSC)	Chr 3: 156.67 – 156.71 Mb	Chr 3: 65.44 – 65.46 Mb
PubMed search
- Wikidata
View/Edit Human	View/Edit Mouse

Poly [ADP-ribose] polymerase 7 (PARP7), also known as TCDD-inducible poly-ADP-ribose polymerase (TIPARP), is an enzyme that in humans is encoded by the TIPARP gene. It is part of the PARP family that catalyzes the transfer of ADP-ribose from NAD^{+} to specific amino acids of itself and other substrate proteins. The 17 members of the PARP family are divided into polyPARPs, monoPARPs, and PARPs without catalytic activity according to different catalytic functions. PARP7 is a monoPARP that catalyzes the transfer of single units of ADP-ribose onto substrates to change their function. PARP7 is involved in tumor generation and immune function recovery.

== Structure ==
PARP7 is characterized by a sequence consisting of 657 amino acids. The protein contains a CCCH-type zinc finger domain for DNA/RNA binding, a protein−protein interaction domain mediating iso-ADP-ribose interaction, a conserved ADP-ribosyltransferase catalytic domain with ADP-ribosyl transferase activity, and an N-terminal nuclear localization signal (NLS).

== Function ==
PARP7 acts by adding a single unit of ADP-ribose to TANK-binding kinase 1 (TBK1), which prevents its activation and represses the type I Interferon (IFN-I) response. PARP7 is amplified in many cancers and acts as a "brake" in the type I IFN response to cytosolic nucleic acid. PARP7 is involved in various biological processes, including intrinsic immunity, cell division, response to viral infections, transcription regulation, receptor degradation, and nervous system development.

Overactivation of astrocytes exacerbates brain damage and impairs the recovery of brain function following a stroke. The expression of PARP7 activates autophagy and stimulates astrocyte activation. By inhibiting PARP7 expression, the activation of astrocytes can be reduced, thereby positively influencing stroke treatment. PARP7 expression impacts hepatic energy metabolism and inflammatory response by decreasing NAD^{+} levels, consequently affecting glucose regulation and promoting the development of nonalcoholic fatty liver disease. PARP7 is also associated with blood pressure, oral cancer, uveal melanoma, meningioma, bone, and obesity diseases.

== Clinical significance ==
=== Viral infection ===
PARP7 plays a dual role in viral replication, with its specific function depending on the type of virus. Following infection with coronavirus, upregulation of PARP7 expression influences the host's antiviral response. Modulating the expression and activity of PARP7 to strengthen the host's immune response represents a promising novel antiviral strategy. PARP7 modulates the antiviral activity of PARP13, an inactive member of the PARP family and plays a role in inhibiting the replication of a wide range of RNA viruses, through mono-ADP-ribosylation (MARylation) modification. Conversely, high expression levels of PARP7 inhibits the replication of specific viruses such as Venezuelan equine encephalitis virus, Getah virus, Sindbis virus, and other RNA viruses.

=== Cancer ===
Activation of the signaling pathway for IFN-I release is an effective way for the human body to clear tumor cells. In the IFN-I signaling pathway, the activation of TBK1 is essential for signal transduction. PARP7 inhibits TBK1 activation via mono-ADP-ribosylation, resulting in the disruption of the IFN-I pathway, ultimately contributing to immune escape in tumor cells. Inhibition of PARP7 activity restores TBK1 phosphorylation function and activates the IFN-I signaling pathway. This cascade activates the Janus kinase (JAK) signal transducer and activator of transcription pathway, promoting the upregulation of CXCL10 expression and recruiting cytotoxic T cells to eliminate tumor cells.

PARP7 inhibits the IFN-I signaling pathway by blocking the degradation of FRA1. Reducing the expression level of PARP7 promotes the degradation of FRA1 and restores the IFN-1 signaling. PARP7 inhibitors have clinical potential in treating FRA1-driven cancers, offering a new application strategy of PARP7 inhibitors for cancer therapy.

The upregulation of PD-1/PD-L1 immune checkpoints obstructs the IFN-I signaling pathway, thereby impeding the recruitment of cytotoxic T lymphocytes. PARP7 inhibitors in combination with PD1/PD-L1 immune checkpoint inhibitor (ICIs) improve tumor prognosis and provide synergistic anti-tumor effects.

The expression of PARP7 varies across different tumor types, and its role differs accordingly. Down-regulating the expression level of PARP7 has excellent therapeutic effects on a variety of cancers, so that the use of PARP7 inhibitors is widely used as a novel approach to immune-mediated anti-tumor therapy.

In ovarian cancer, reducing the expression of PARP7 increases microtubule stability and slows the growth of ovarian cancer cells. Knockdown of the PARP7 gene leads to a decrease in cell growth and an increase in microtubule content. In prostate cancer, the activation of the Androgen Receptor (AR) signaling is important for tumor cell survival and growth. PARP7 modifies multiple cysteine residues of AR through ADP-ribosylation, thereby promoting the growth and survival of prostate cancer cells. The inhibition of PARP7 prevents AR from forming complexes with DTX3L and PARP9, limiting the growth and survival of prostate cancer cells.

Ribon Therapeutics reported the first PARP7 inhibitor, RBN-2397. This compound has progressed to clinical phase II trials for the treatment of advanced and metastatic solid tumors. RBN-2397 exhibits extremely high inhibitory potency against PARP7 with an IC50 value of 5.0 M and significant growth inhibition of CT-26 tumor cells in a mouse xenograft model.
