= Cabassou virus =

Virus classification
- (unranked): Virus
- Realm: Riboviria
- Kingdom: Orthornavirae
- Phylum: Kitrinoviricota
- Class: Alsuviricetes
- Order: Martellivirales
- Family: Togaviridae
- Genus: Alphavirus
- Species: Alphavirus cabassou

Species of virus

Cabassou virus is an RNA virus in the genus Alphavirus.
