= Bebaru virus =

Virus classification
- (unranked): Virus
- Realm: Riboviria
- Kingdom: Orthornavirae
- Phylum: Kitrinoviricota
- Class: Alsuviricetes
- Order: Martellivirales
- Family: Togaviridae
- Genus: Alphavirus
- Species: Alphavirus bebaru

Species of virus

Bebaru virus is an RNA virus in the genus Alphavirus. The virus (BEBV) has not had any recorded large outbreaks. It is believed to be spread by mosquitoes, like the majority of Alphaviruses are.
