= Fort Morgan virus =

Virus classification
- (unranked): Virus
- Realm: Riboviria
- Kingdom: Orthornavirae
- Phylum: Kitrinoviricota
- Class: Alsuviricetes
- Order: Martellivirales
- Family: Togaviridae
- Genus: Alphavirus
- Species: Alphavirus fortmorgan

Species of virus

Fort Morgan virus is an RNA virus in the genus Alphavirus. It is an Alphavirus isolated from nesting Cliff Swallows, House Sparrows and from cimicid bugs in eastern Colorado for which the name Fort Morgan virus was proposed.
