= Pancreas disease in farmed salmon =

Salmon pancreas disease virus

Virus classification
- (unranked): Virus
- Realm: Riboviria
- Kingdom: Orthornavirae
- Phylum: Kitrinoviricota
- Class: Alsuviricetes
- Order: Martellivirales
- Family: Togaviridae
- Genus: Alphavirus
- Species: Alphavirus salmon

Salmon Pancreas disease (PD or SPD) is caused by a species of Salmonid Alphavirus (SAV) called Salmon pancreas disease virus (SPDV). The virus was first described in 1976 in Scotland and in 1989 in Norway. It affects farmed Atlantic salmon (Salmo salar) caused by Marine SAV2 and SAV3 and has also been identified in Rainbow trout (Oncorhyncus mykiss) in the seawater phase caused by SAV2 where the disease is commonly referred to as Sleeping Disease (SD).

== Salmonid Alphavirus ==
Salmonid Alphavirus is an RNA virus. Six genotypes of SAV have been identified (referred to as SAV1, 2, 3, 4, 5 and 6), differentiated by the nucleic acid sequences of certain genes. The strains of SAV causing PD belong to the genotypes SAV1, Marine SAV2 and SAV3.

== Diagnosis ==
When the fish is infected, it can cause sudden loss of appetite, lethargy and increased mortality. The general symptoms of this virus infection also include difficulties to maintain a correct position in the water due to muscle damage.

== Transmission ==
Cross infection is caused by seawater currents, human activities and lacking measures to prevent risk of transmission between sites. Fallowing procedures have proved successful and prevents the survival of the virus in the environment through the fallowing period, and repeated disease outbreak on the same site is due to introduction of new virus.

== Geographical distribution ==
Most research is performed in Ireland, Scotland and Norway but the virus has also been identified in England and Mainland Europe where the SAV2 virus affects rainbow trout.

== Economic impact ==
The virus is highly infectious and causes large economic losses in the fish farming industry, particularly in Norway and Scotland. In 2010, the economic loss was estimated to be 0.72 € per kg in Norwegian salmon production due to high mortality rates, reduced growth and the quality of the finished product.

== Prevention and treatment ==
A monovalent vaccine against PD was made commercially available in 2007 and a multivalent vaccine, capable of immunising the fish against multiple strains of the SPDV, was introduced in 2015. Vaccination is shown to reduce the risk of the fish being infected and reduces the mortality rates due to PD. In addition, vaccination reduces viral shedding into the environment (virus being released from the cells) from already infected individuals, reducing the risk of contamination of neighbouring fish farms.

Commercially available fish feed has also been used in an attempt to improve the fish's immune system, but the efficiency of this has not been documented.

In Norway, a combination of vaccination, improve biosecurity measures, depopulation, closure of poorly managed fish farms and geographical separation of sites has proved to reduce PD outbreaks. In addition, regularly updated interactive maps are updated daily allowing all interested parties to monitor and contribute to the current state of PD geographically. Between 2009 and 2011 there were between 75 and 89 outbreaks per year. To prevent spreading the Norwegian coastline was in 2008 divided into two administrative zones separated by a production free zone of 10 nautical miles at the same time a vaccination programme was introduced. However, the effect of this has been questioned since the number of PD outbreaks has not been reduced.
