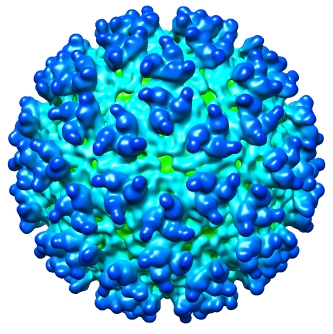
- CryoEM model of Western equine encephalitis virus, 12Å resolution. EMDB entry EMD-5210

Virus classification
- (unranked): Virus
- Realm: Riboviria
- Kingdom: Orthornavirae
- Phylum: Kitrinoviricota
- Class: Alsuviricetes
- Order: Martellivirales
- Family: Togaviridae
- Genus: Alphavirus
- Species: Alphavirus western

= Western equine encephalitis virus =

Species of virus

Western equine encephalitis virus
- Specialty: Infectious disease

Western equine encephalitis virus is the causative agent of the relatively uncommon viral disease Western equine encephalitis (WEE). An alphavirus of the family Togaviridae, the WEE virus is an arbovirus (arthropod-borne virus) transmitted by mosquitoes of the genera Culex and Culiseta. WEE is a recombinant virus between two other alphaviruses, an ancestral Sindbis virus-like virus, and an ancestral Eastern equine encephalitis virus-like virus. There have been under 700 confirmed cases in the U.S. since 1964. This virus contains an envelope that is made up of glycoproteins and nucleic acids. The virus is transmitted to people and horses by bites from infected mosquitoes (Culex tarsalis and Aedes taeniorhynchus) and birds during wet, summer months.

According to the CDC, geographic occurrence for this virus is worldwide, and tends to be more prevalent in places in and around swampy areas where human populations tend to be limited. In North America, WEE is seen primarily in U. S. states and Canadian provinces west of the Mississippi River. The disease is also seen in countries of South America. WEE is commonly a subclinical infection; symptomatic infections are uncommon. However, the disease can cause serious sequelae in infants and children. Unlike Eastern equine encephalitis, the overall mortality of WEE is low (approximately 4%) and is associated mostly with infection in the elderly. Approximately 15–20% of horses that acquire the virus will die or be put down. There is no human vaccine for WEE and there are no licensed therapeutic drugs in the U.S. for this infection. The virus affects the brain and spinal cord of the infected host.

== History ==
WEE was discovered in 1930 when a number of horses in the San Joaquin Valley of California, USA died of a mysterious encephalitis. Karl Friedrich Meyer investigated but was not able to isolate the pathogen from necropsies of horses that had been dead for some time and needed samples from an animal in the earlier stages of disease. When the team heard of a horse that appeared to have encephalitis, its owner threatened to shoot the scientists. However Meyer was able to convince the farmer's wife that the horse was dying anyway, and to secretly signal him when the farmer was asleep in exchange for $20 (as this was during the Great Depression, this was a substantial amount of money). Meyer and his colleagues hid in the bushes until the signal, euthanized the horse and stole its head. They successfully isolated WEEV from the brain tissue.

== Biological weapon ==
Western equine encephalitis virus was one of more than a dozen agents that the United States researched as potential biological weapons before the nation suspended its biological weapons program.

== Clinical Features ==
=== Incubation and Symptoms ===
The incubation period for the Western equine encephalitis virus is 5-10 days. Although the infection is primarily asymptomatic, individuals at risk (children aged 2 years and younger, and adults older than 60), may develop a more serious course of illness. Symptoms of WEE may range from a febrile illness including fever, chills, malaise, weakness, and myalgias to more severe course including aseptic meningitis or encephalitis leading to coma or even death. Long-term neurologic sequelae may include fatigue, irritability, headache, and tremors being most common. Young children are more likely to have permanent neurologic disability, whilst older adults are more likely to die from complications, should a severe course occur. According to the CDC as of 2025, the case-fatality rate of people with WEE is 3-15%.

=== Diagnosis ===
Diagnosis may be made via serological testing of the serum or cerebrospinal fluid (CSF) via polymerase chain reaction (PCR) or enzyme-linked immunosorbent assay (ELISA). Additionally, reverse transcription polymerase chain reaction (RT-PCR), isolation from tissue cultures, immunohistochemistry, hemagglutination inhibition (of paired samples) or complement fixation (of paired samples) are viable methods. The presence of IgM antibodies may correlate with an acute infection and may be detected within 1 to 3 weeks from the onset of symptoms. IgG antibodies are generally detectable within 1 to 3 weeks after infection with peaks at 1 to 2 months. IgG antibody titers are generally an indication of exposure and, depending on the titer, may indicate a recent infection. Testing for WEE cross-reacts with St. Louis encephalitis virus, making the two infections hard to distinguish from one another.

== See also ==
- Eastern equine encephalitis virus
