= Highlands J virus =

Virus classification
- (unranked): Virus
- Realm: Riboviria
- Kingdom: Orthornavirae
- Phylum: Kitrinoviricota
- Class: Alsuviricetes
- Order: Martellivirales
- Family: Togaviridae
- Genus: Alphavirus
- Species: Alphavirus highlandsj

Species of virus

Highlands J (HJ) virus is a zoonotic alphavirus native to North and South America. It maintains a natural reservoir in the songbird population of freshwater swamps (generally scrub jays and blue jays) and is transmitted by the bite of the female Culiseta melanura mosquito.

Though nearly identical in structure and natural cycle to the Eastern equine encephalitis virus, it is considerably less virulent than its cousin, causing relatively mild symptoms in its primary avian reservoir and only nominally capable of transmission to mammals. A 1995 study conducted in Florida swampland found that 15% of swamp-dwelling jays tested positive for HJ antibodies, all of which were asymptomatic and in apparent good health. Recorded bird deaths from HJ infection are uncommon but not rare, and include several domestic turkeys at a commercial facility and young broiler chickens in an experimental setting.

Transmission to equines or humans via mosquito is also possible, though even more rare. During the 1990-1991 St. Louis encephalitis outbreak in Missouri, 4 patients were found to be comorbidly infected with SLE and HJ, though no harmful effects were attributed to the HJ alone. A limited survey of swamp-dwelling rodents in Florida found one cotton mouse and one cotton rat with antibodies to HJ, both asymptomatic. The sole mammalian fatality attributed to HJ was a Florida horse originally diagnosed with Western equine encephalitis in 1964, which was later redetermined in 1989 to have been caused by HJ.

Despite its negligible virulence in humans, it is often tested for in US domestic mosquito control programs as an indicator of fruitful conditions for other mosquito-borne zoonoses to multiply.
