= Una virus =

Virus classification
- (unranked): Virus
- Realm: Riboviria
- Kingdom: Orthornavirae
- Phylum: Kitrinoviricota
- Class: Alsuviricetes
- Order: Martellivirales
- Family: Togaviridae
- Genus: Alphavirus
- Species: Alphavirus una

Species of virus

Una virus is a virus species in the genus Alphavirus. According to the Baltimore classification of viruses, it is a class IV virus. It has a linear single-stranded RNA genome. Una virus is an arbovirus or arthropod-borne virus, transmitted primarily by an arthropod species.

== Location and distribution ==
The Una virus is widely distributed in South America, where infections have been detected in mosquitoes and vertebrate hosts such as humans, birds and horses. It was first isolated in Psorophora ferox mosquitoes in the state of Pará, Brazil. The virus is widely distributed in tropical and subtropical regions of Central and South America, such as Brazil, Colombia, French Guiana, Panama, Suriname, Trinidad and Venezuela. It is the only member of the SFV complex which has activity reported in Argentina, where two strains of the virus, (Cba An 979 and Cba An 995) have been isolated from febrile or dead equines at Rio Segundo and Colonia Videla, two villages located in the province of Córdoba. The reporting of the Una virus in Argentina demonstrates an enlargement of the southern limit of the distribution of this virus group.
