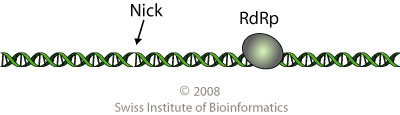
- Endornaviridae particle. Shown is the replicative form (dsRNA) of the (+)ssRNA virus.

Virus classification
- (unranked): Virus
- Realm: Riboviria
- Kingdom: Orthornavirae
- Phylum: Kitrinoviricota
- Class: Alsuviricetes
- Order: Martellivirales
- Family: Endornaviridae

Genera
- Alphaendornavirus; Betaendornavirus

= Endornaviridae =

Family of viruses

Endornaviridae is a family of viruses. Plants, fungi, and oomycetes serve as natural hosts. There are 31 species in this family, assigned to 2 genera (Alphaendornavirus and Betaendornavirus). Members of Alphaendornavirus infect plants, fungi and the oomycete Phytophthora sp., members of Betaendornavirus infect ascomycete fungi.

== Taxonomy ==
The following genera are assigned to the family:

- Alphaendornavirus
- Betaendornavirus

== Structure ==
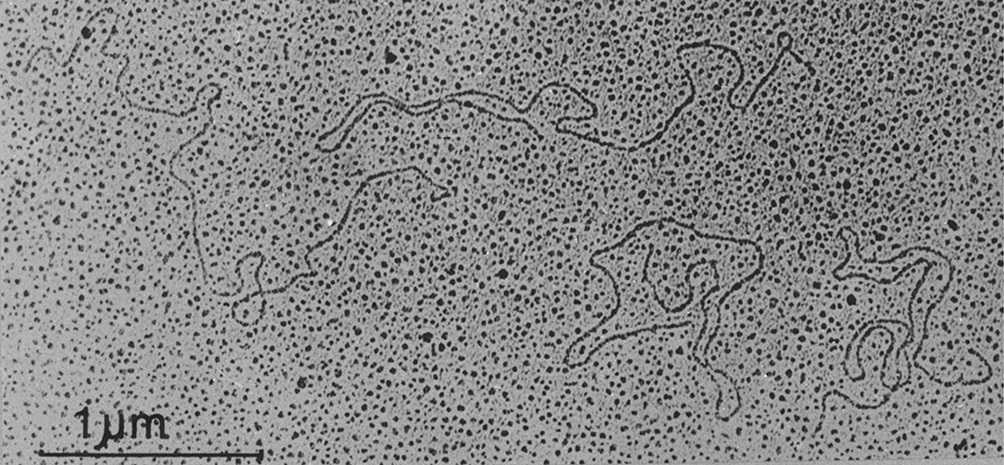
Transmission electron micrograph of dsRNA molecules of Oryza sativa endornavirus isolate Nipponbare.

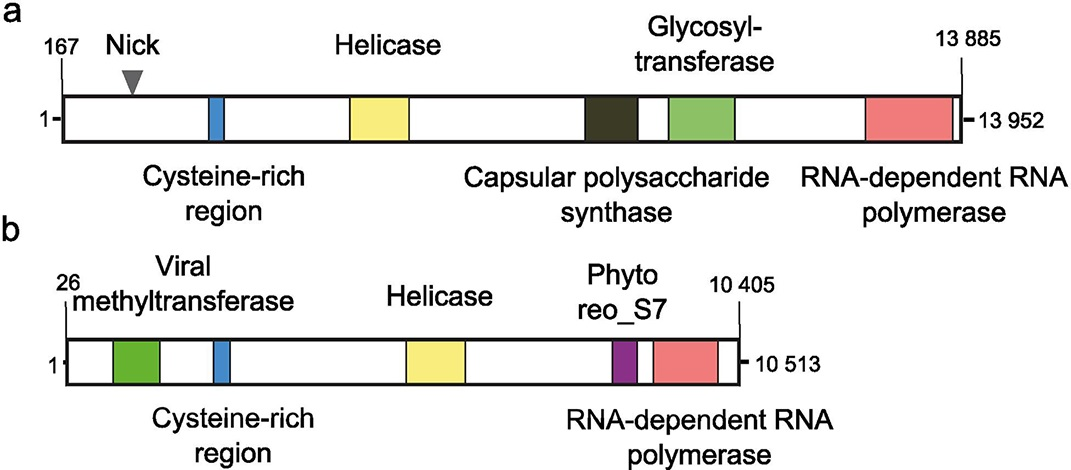
Genome maps of Oryza sativa endornavirus isolate Nipponbare (a) and Sclerotinia sclerotiorum endornavirus 1 (b). Numbers indicate genome nucleotide positions.

Linear, single-stranded, positive-sense RNA genome of about 14 kb to 17.6 kb. A site specific break (nick) is found in the coding strand about 1 to 2 kb from the 5’ terminus. ViralZone conflicts with ICTV, listing Endornaviridae as dsRNA viruses.

As the Endornaviridae genomes don't include a coat protein (CP) gene, no true virions are associated with members of this family. For Vicia faba endornavirus, the RNA genome has been associated with some pleomorphic cytoplasmic membrane vesicles.

== Life cycle ==
Viral replication is cytoplasmic. The viral replicative form of the Endornaviridae is dsRNA. Replication follows the double-stranded RNA virus replication model. Double-stranded RNA virus transcription is the method of transcription.

As the replicative dsRNA form is relatively stable, it can be found in comparatively high quantities in host tissues, and therefore is a likely subject of isolations (this is the reason why Endornaviridae often are classified as dsRNA viruses, in contrast to the official ssRNA(+) ICTV classification).

The virus exits the host cell by cell to cell movement.

Plants, fungi, and oomycetes serve as the natural hosts. Transmission routes are pollen associated.
