= O'nyong'nyong virus =

Species of virus

- Specialty: Infectious disease

O'nyong'nyong virus (ONNV) was first isolated by researchers at the Uganda Virus Research Institute in Entebbe, Uganda, during a large outbreak of a disease in 1959 that resembled dengue fever. ONNV is a togavirus (family Togaviridae), genus Alphavirus, is closely related to the chikungunya and Igbo Ora viruses, and is a member of the Semliki Forest antigenic complex. The name was given to the disease by the Acholi tribe during the 1959 outbreak. The name comes from the Nilotic language of Uganda and Sudan and means "weakening of the joints". The virus can infect humans and may cause disease.

== Signs and symptoms ==
Common symptoms of infection with the virus are polyarthritis, rash and fever. Other symptoms include eye pain, chest pain, lymphadenitis and lethargy. The disease is self-limiting. No fatalities due to infection are known.

== Cause ==
O'nyong'nyong virus

Virus classification
- (unranked): Virus
- Realm: Riboviria
- Kingdom: Orthornavirae
- Phylum: Kitrinoviricota
- Class: Alsuviricetes
- Order: Martellivirales
- Family: Togaviridae
- Genus: Alphavirus
- Species: Alphavirus onyong

=== Strains ===
ONNV has at least three major subtypes, or strains, the genomic sequences of which are currently available on genome databases.

=== Transmission ===
ONNV is transmitted by bites from an infected mosquito. It is the only virus whose primary vectors are anopheline mosquitoes (Anopheles funestus and Anopheles gambiae).

== Epidemiology ==
There have been two epidemics of o'nyong'nyong fever. The first occurred from 1959 to 1962, spreading from Uganda to Kenya, Tanzania, Zaire (Democratic Republic of the Congo), Malawi and Mozambique, and affecting over two million people, one of the largest arbovirus epidemics ever recorded. The first virus isolates were obtained during this outbreak from mosquitoes and human blood samples collected from Gulu in northern Uganda in 1959.

The second epidemic in 1996–1997 was confined to Uganda. The 35-year hiatus between the two outbreaks and evidence of an outbreak in 1904–1906 in Uganda indicate a 30–50 year cycle for epidemics.

In 2013, ONNV was confirmed as the cause of disease in a 60-year-old German woman who became infected while traveling in East Africa. In 2015–2016 there was a minor outbreak in Uganda with 51 suspected cases.

There has been a minor outbreak in Mombasa, Kenya, and the County Government of Mombasa issued a warning.

A 2015 study indicated that ONNV is endemic in coastal East Africa, along with chikungunya virus.
