= Getah virus =

Virus classification
- (unranked): Virus
- Realm: Riboviria
- Kingdom: Orthornavirae
- Phylum: Kitrinoviricota
- Class: Alsuviricetes
- Order: Martellivirales
- Family: Togaviridae
- Genus: Alphavirus
- Species: Alphavirus getah

Synonyms
- Sagiyama virus

Species of virus

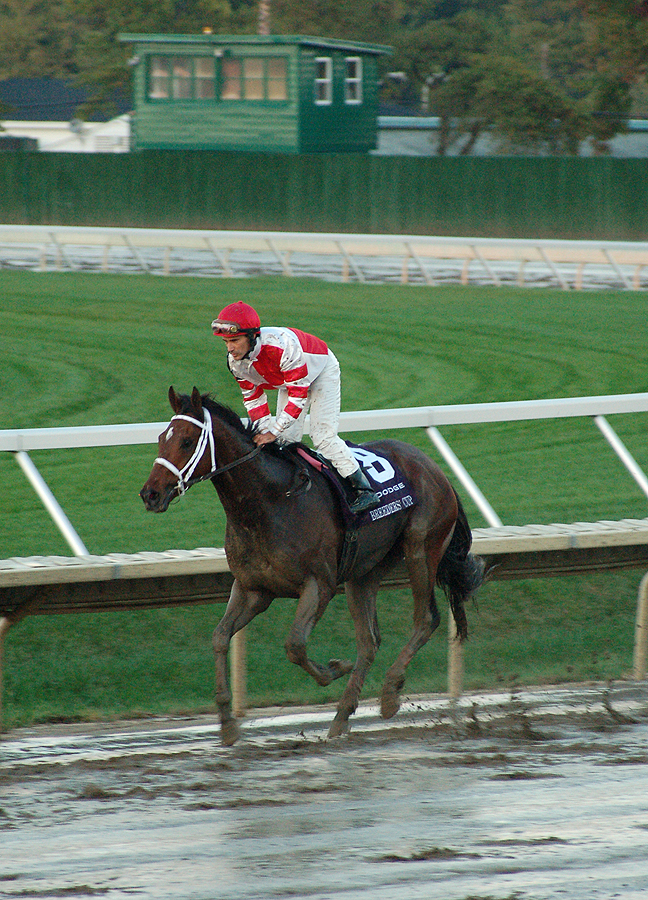
The first outbreak of Getah virus occurred in racehorses.

Getah virus is a mosquito-borne arbovirus in the Alphavirus genus. The virus was first isolated in Malaysia in 1955 from the Culex gelidus mosquito. It has been known to infect pigs but more commonly affects horses. The virus was isolated near rubber plantations; the word Getah means rubber in Malay. The first outbreak among racehorses occurred in Japan September–November 1978. Getah virus is widely distributed in South-east Asian countries and while previous studies have indicated the presence of Getah virus in Northern Australia these have recently been brought into question.

== Genome ==
Getah virus has a positive-sense single stranded RNA genome. According to Baltimore Classification System, this virus is in Group IV.

The virus appears to have evolved about 1872 (95% range: 1773 - 1942) and has diverged into four lineages.

== Transmission and infection ==
The virus is transmitted by mosquitoes, specifically those in the Aedes and Culex genera. It is also transmitted between horses through aerosols or direct nasal contact, though this seems unlikely since a large portion of virus particles are necessary for transmission and are found in lower numbers in nasal secretions.

In horses, the virus causes fever, rash, edema of the hind legs, and swelling of the lymph nodes. In inoculated horses, the symptoms manifested themselves beginning 2–4 days post infection. In pigs, the virus causes miscarriage; symptoms occurred 1–3 days after experimental infection. Though the virus does not produce illness in humans, neutralizing antibodies have been identified within humans.

=== Treatment ===
There is an inactivated-virus vaccine for horses. Once the horse is infected, supportive therapy is the only treatment available. Horses usually make a full recovery after 1 to 2 weeks. No Getah virus deaths have been reported in horses in clinical settings, and deaths only occur in pigs in the fetal stage.
