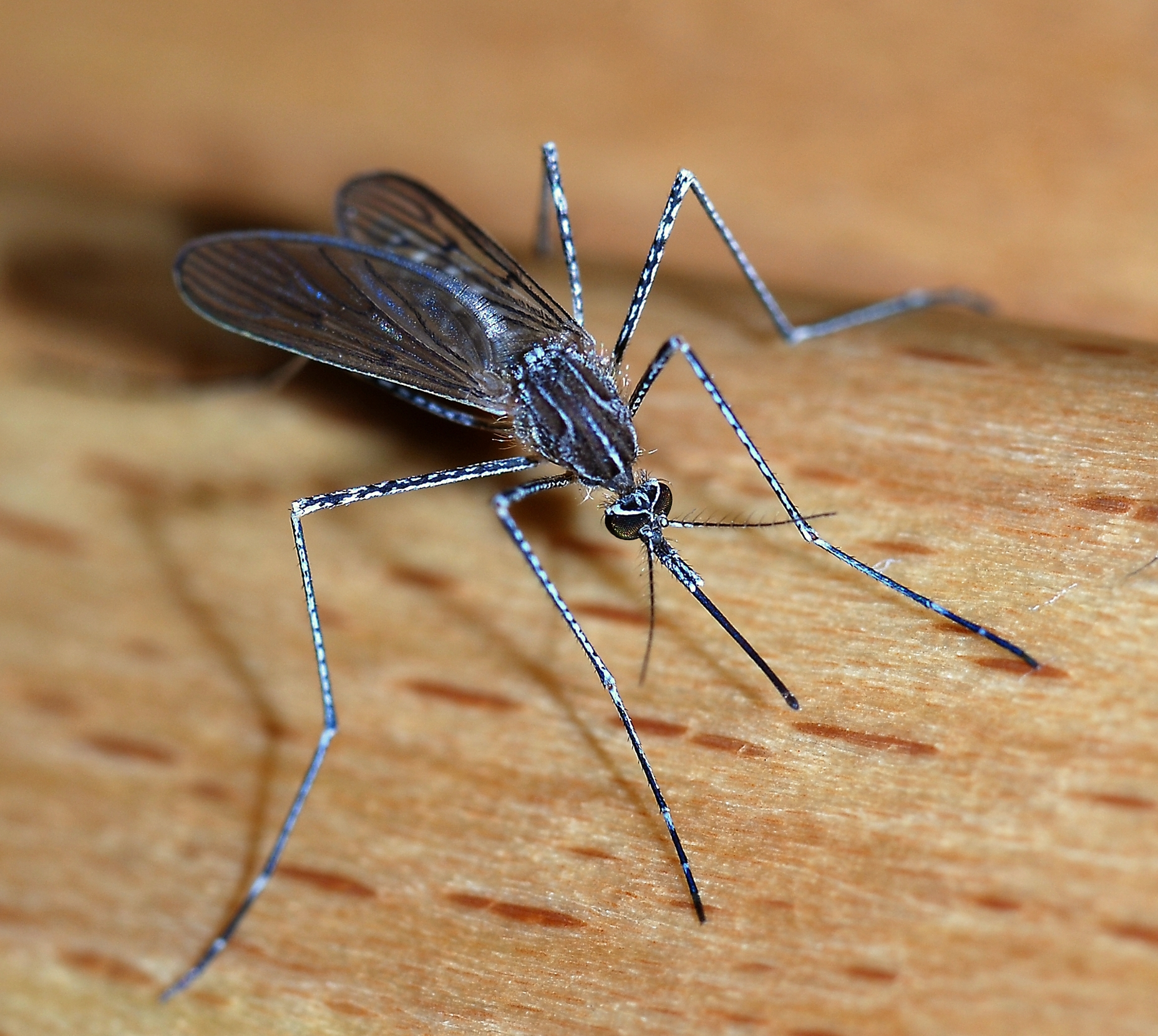
- An image of a Culicine mosquito

Virus classification
- (unranked): Virus
- Realm: Riboviria
- Kingdom: Orthornavirae
- Phylum: Kitrinoviricota
- Class: Alsuviricetes
- Order: Martellivirales
- Family: Togaviridae
- Genus: Alphavirus
- Species: Alphavirus ndumu

= Ndumu virus =

Species of virus

Ndumu virus (NDUV) is an RNA virus in the genus Alphavirus. It was first isolated in 1961 from culicine mosquitoes collected in northern Natal, Union of South Africa. The virus has also been detected in Kenya, Senegal and Uganda. It has been identified in demesticated pigs and mosquitoes in a study in Uganda.
