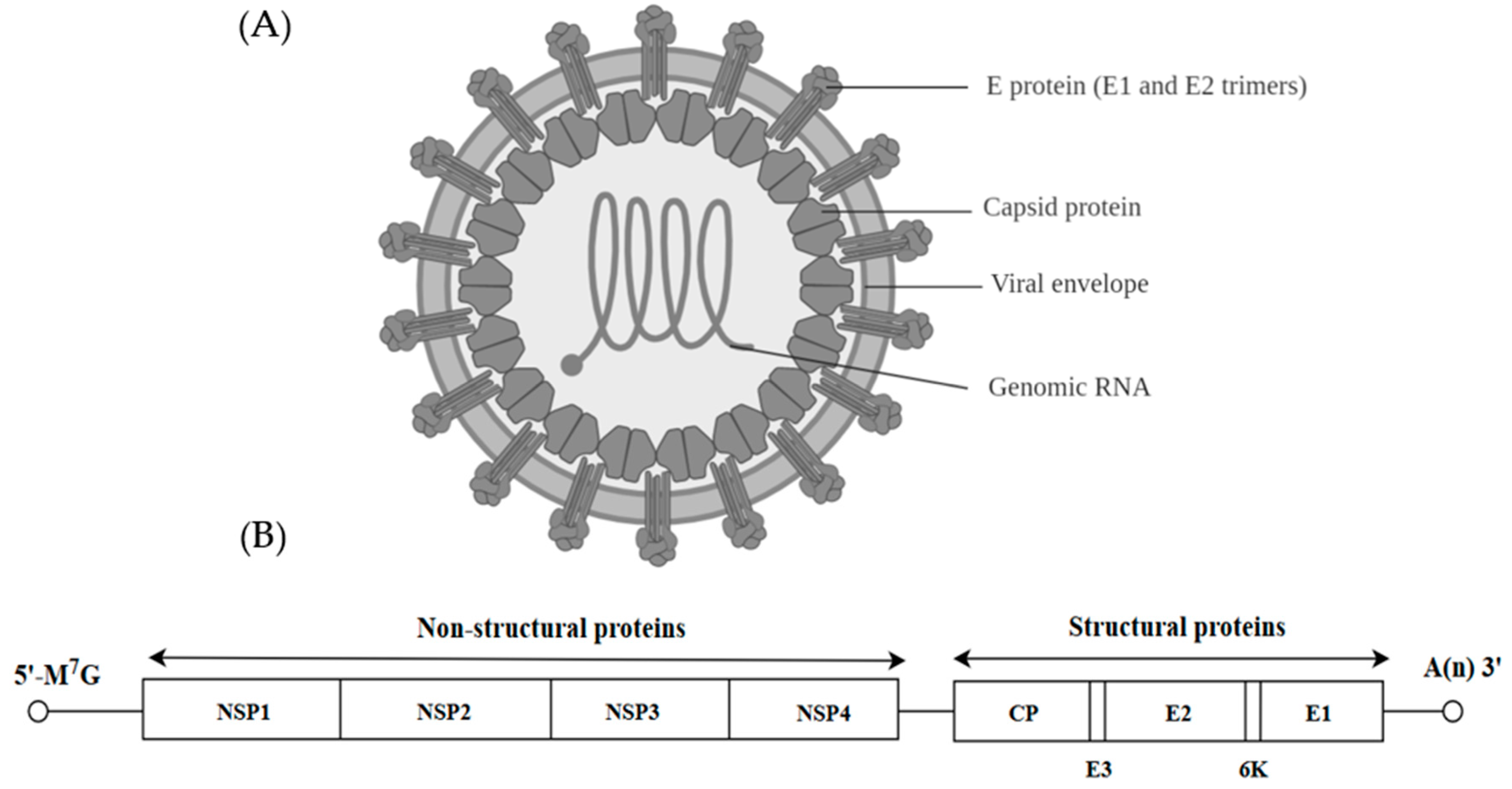
- Structure and genome of an alphavirus
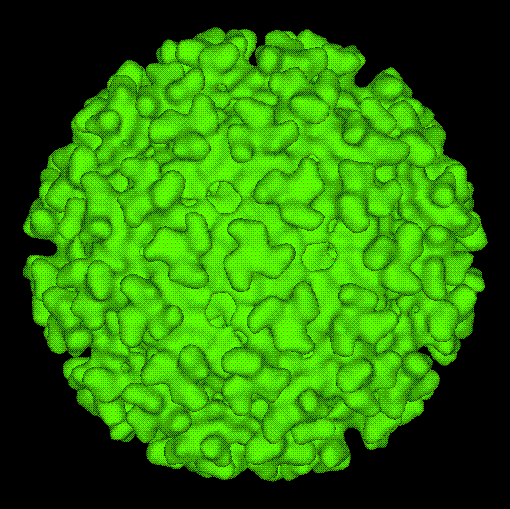
- A computer-generated model of the surface of an Alphavirus derived by cryoelectron microscopy. The spike-like structures on the virion surface are trimers composed of heterodimers of the virion surface Glycoproteins E1 and E2. These spikes are used by the virus to attach to susceptible animal cells

Virus classification
- (unranked): Virus
- Realm: Riboviria
- Kingdom: Orthornavirae
- Phylum: Kitrinoviricota
- Class: Alsuviricetes
- Order: Martellivirales
- Family: Togaviridae
- Genus: Alphavirus

Species
- See text

= Alphavirus =

Genus of viruses

Alphavirus is a genus of RNA viruses, the sole genus in the Togaviridae family. Alphaviruses belong to group IV of the Baltimore classification of viruses, with a positive-sense, single-stranded RNA genome. There are 32 alphavirus species, which infect various vertebrates such as humans, rodents, fish, birds, and larger mammals such as horses, as well as invertebrates. Alphaviruses that can infect both vertebrates and arthropods are referred to as dual-host alphaviruses, while insect-specific alphaviruses such as Eilat virus and Yada yada virus are restricted to their competent arthropod vector. Transmission between species and their vertebrate hosts (including human) occurs mainly via mosquitoes, making the alphaviruses a member of the collection of arboviruses – or arthropod-borne viruses. Alphavirus particles are enveloped, have a 70 nm diameter, tend to be spherical (although slightly pleomorphic), and have a 40 nm isometric nucleocapsid.

== Genome ==
Alpha_E1_glycop
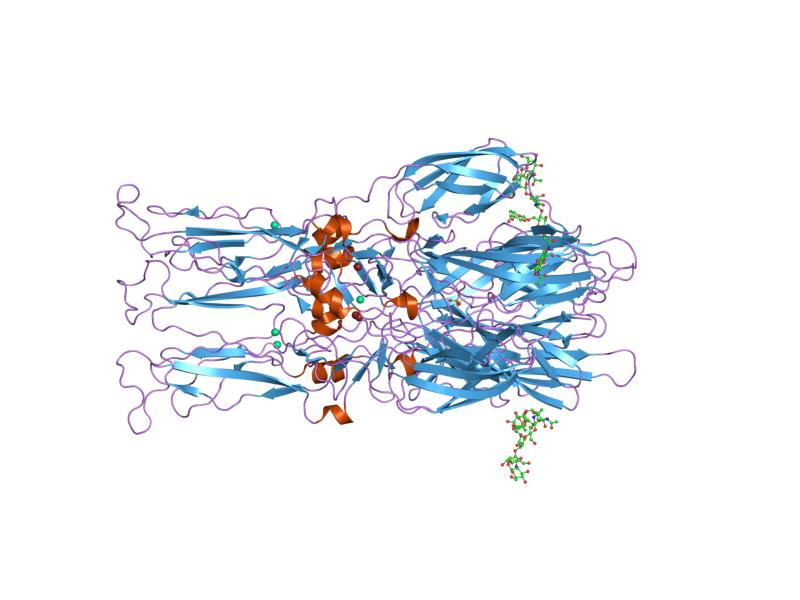
- Crystal structure of the homotrimer of fusion glycoprotein E1 from Semliki Forest virus

Identifiers
- Symbol: Alpha_E1_glycop
- Pfam: PF01589
- InterPro: IPR002548
- SCOP2: 1rer / SCOPe / SUPFAM
- TCDB: 1.G
- OPM superfamily: 109
- OPM protein: 1rer
Available protein structures:
- PDB: IPR002548 PF01589 (ECOD; PDBsum)
- AlphaFold: IPR002548; PF01589

Alpha_E2_glycop
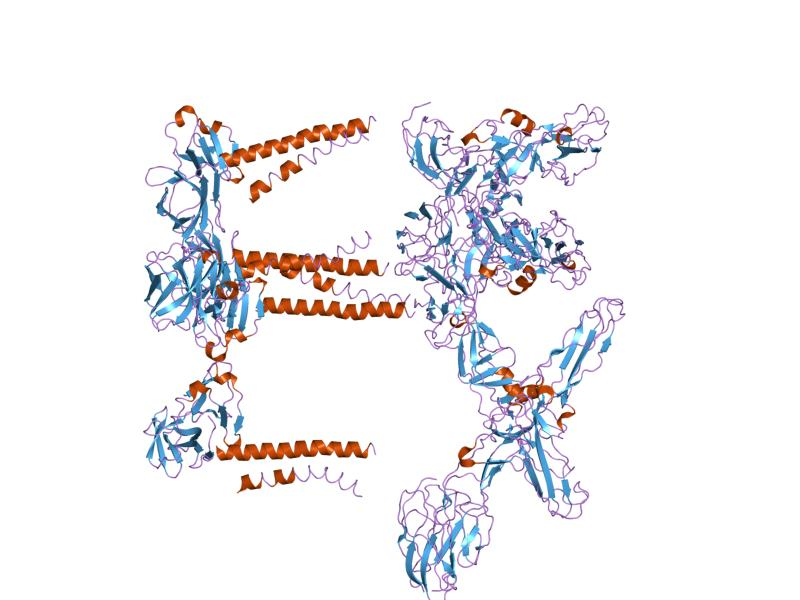
- Mapping the E2 glycoprotein of alphaviruses

Identifiers
- Symbol: Alpha_E2_glycop
- Pfam: PF00943
- InterPro: IPR000936
- TCDB: 1.G
- OPM superfamily: 109
- OPM protein: 2yew
Available protein structures:
- PDB: IPR000936 PF00943 (ECOD; PDBsum)
- AlphaFold: IPR000936; PF00943

Alpha_E3_glycop

Identifiers
- Symbol: Alpha_E3_glycop
- Pfam: PF01563
- InterPro: IPR002533
- TCDB: 1.G
- OPM superfamily: 109
Available protein structures:
- PDB: IPR002533 PF01563 (ECOD; PDBsum)
- AlphaFold: IPR002533; PF01563

The alphaviruses are small, spherical, enveloped viruses with a genome of a single strand of positive-sense RNA. The total genome length ranges between 11,000 and 12,000 nucleotides, and has a 5' cap and a 3' poly-A tail. The four non-structural protein genes are encoded in the 5′ two-thirds of the genome, while the three structural proteins are translated from a subgenomic mRNA colinear with the 3′ one-third of the genome.

There are two open reading frames (ORFs) in the genome, nonstructural and structural. The first is non-structural and encodes proteins (nsP1–nsP4) necessary for transcription and replication of viral RNA. The second encodes three structural proteins: the core nucleocapsid protein C, and the envelope proteins P62 and E1, which associate as a heterodimer. The viral membrane-anchored surface glycoproteins are responsible for receptor recognition and entry into target cells through membrane fusion.

=== Structural proteins ===
The proteolytic maturation of P62 into E2 and E3 causes a change in the viral surface. Together the E1, E2, and sometimes E3, glycoprotein "spikes" form an E1/E2 dimer or an E1/E2/E3 trimer, where E2 extends from the centre to the vertices, E1 fills the space between the vertices, and E3, if present, is at the distal end of the spike. Upon exposure of the virus to the acidity of the endosome, E1 dissociates from E2 to form an E1 homotrimer, which is necessary for the fusion step to drive the cellular and viral membranes together. The alphaviral glycoprotein E1 is a class II viral fusion protein, which is structurally different from the class I fusion proteins found in influenza virus and HIV. The structure of the Semliki Forest virus revealed a structure that is similar to that of flaviviral glycoprotein E, with three structural domains in the same primary sequence arrangement. The E2 glycoprotein functions to interact with the nucleocapsid through its cytoplasmic domain, while its ectodomain is responsible for binding a cellular receptor. Most alphaviruses lose the peripheral protein E3, but in Semliki viruses it remains associated with the viral surface.

=== Nonstructural proteins ===
Four nonstructural proteins (nsP1–4) which are produced as a single polyprotein constitute the virus' replication machinery. The processing of the polyprotein occurs in a highly regulated manner, with cleavage at the P2/3 junction influencing RNA template use during genome replication. This site is located at the base of a narrow cleft and is not readily accessible. Before cleavage, nsP3 creates a ring structure that encircles nsP2. These two proteins have an extensive interface.

Mutations in nsP2 that produce noncytopathic viruses or a temperature sensitive phenotypes cluster at the P2/P3 interface region. P3 mutations opposite the location of the nsP2 noncytopathic mutations prevent efficient cleavage of P2/3. This in turn affects RNA infectivity altering viral RNA production levels.

== Virology ==
The virus has a 60–70 nanometer diameter. It is enveloped, spherical and has a positive-strand RNA genome of ~12 kilobases. The genome encodes two polyproteins. The first polyprotein consists of four non-structural units: in order from the N terminal to the C terminal - nsP1, nsP2, nsP3, and nsP4. The second is a structural polyprotein composed of five expression units: from the N terminal to the C terminal - Capsid, E3, E2, 6K and E1. A sub genomic positive strand RNA—the 26S RNA—is replicated from a negative-stranded RNA intermediate. This serves as template for the synthesis of viral structural proteins. Most alphaviruses have conserved domains involved in regulation of viral RNA synthesis.

The nucleocapsid, 40 nanometers in diameter, contains 240 copies of the capsid protein and has a T = 4 icosahedral symmetry. The E1 and E2 viral glycoproteins are embedded in the lipid bilayer. Single E1 and E2 molecules associate to form heterodimers. The E1–E2 heterodimers form one-to-one contacts between the E2 protein and the nucleocapsid monomers. The E1 and E2 proteins mediate contact between the virus and the host cell.

Several receptors have been identified. These include prohibitin, phosphatidylserine, glycosaminoglycans and ATP synthase β subunit (ref needed).

Replication occurs within the cytoplasm, specifically in areas termed "spherules" separated by plasma membrane invaginations from the rest. Each complex occupies one such area of about 50-nm in inner diameter.

Virions mature by budding through the plasma membrane, where virus-encoded surface glycoproteins E2 and E1 are assimilated. These two glycoproteins are the targets of numerous serologic reactions and tests including neutralization and hemagglutination inhibition. The alphaviruses show various degrees of antigenic cross-reactivity in these reactions and this forms the basis for the seven antigenic complexes, 32 species and many subtypes and varieties. The E2 protein is the site of most neutralizing epitopes, while the E1 protein contains more conserved, cross-reactive epitopes.

== Evolution ==
A study of this taxon suggests that this group of viruses had a marine origin—specifically the Southern Ocean—and that they have subsequently spread to both the Old and New World.

There are three subgroups in this genus: the Semliki Forest virus subgroup (Semliki Forest virus, O'nyong-nyong virus and Ross River virus); the eastern equine encephalitis virus subgroup (eastern equine encephalitis virus and Venezuelan equine encephalitis virus) and the Sindbis virus subgroup. Sindbis virus, geographically restricted to the Old World, is more closely related to the eastern equine encephalitis subgroup, which are New World viruses, than it is to the Semliki Forest virus subgroup which is also found in the Old World.

== Taxonomy ==
The following species are assigned to the genus, listed by scientific name and followed by their common names:

- Alphavirus aura, Aura virus
- Alphavirus barmah, Barmah Forest virus
- Alphavirus bebaru, Bebaru virus
- Alphavirus caaingua, Caaingua virus
- Alphavirus cabassou, Cabassou virus
- Alphavirus chikungunya, Chikungunya virus
- Alphavirus eastern, Eastern equine encephalitis virus
- Alphavirus eilat, Eilat virus
- Alphavirus everglades, Everglades virus
- Alphavirus fortmorgan, Fort Morgan virus
- Alphavirus getah, Getah virus
- Alphavirus highlandsj, Highlands J virus
- Alphavirus madariaga, Madariaga virus
- Alphavirus mayaro, Mayaro virus
- Alphavirus middelburg, Middelburg virus
- Alphavirus mossopedras, Mosso das Pedras virus
- Alphavirus mucambo, Mucambo virus
- Alphavirus ndumu, Ndumu virus
- Alphavirus negro, Rio Negro virus
- Alphavirus onyong, O'nyong'nyong virus
- Alphavirus pixuna, Pixuna virus
- Alphavirus rossriver, Ross River virus
- Alphavirus salmon, Salmon pancreas disease virus
- Alphavirus seal, Southern elephant seal virus
- Alphavirus semliki, Semliki Forest virus
- Alphavirus sindbis, Sindbis virus
- Alphavirus tonate, Tonate virus
- Alphavirus trocara, Trocara virus
- Alphavirus una, Una virus
- Alphavirus venezuelan, Venezuelan equine encephalitis virus
- Alphavirus western, Western equine encephalitis virus
- Alphavirus whataroa, Whataroa virus

The seven complexes are:

Barmah Forest virus complex

Barmah Forest virus

Eastern equine encephalitis complex

Eastern equine encephalitis virus (seven antigenic types)

Middelburg virus complex

Middelburg virus

Ndumu virus complex

Ndumu virus

Semliki Forest virus complex

Bebaru virus
Chikungunya virus
Getah virus
Mayaro virus

Subtype: Una virus

O'nyong'nyong virus

Subtype: Igbo-Ora virus

Ross River virus

Subtype: Sagiyama virus

Semliki Forest virus

Subtype: Me Tri virus

Venezuelan equine encephalitis complex

Cabassou virus
Everglades virus
Mosso das Pedras virus
Mucambo virus
Paramana virus
Pixuna virus
Rio Negro virus
Trocara virus

Subtype: Bijou Bridge virus

Venezuelan equine encephalitis virus

Western equine encephalitis complex

Aura virus
Babanki virus
Kyzylagach virus
Sindbis virus
Ockelbo virus
Whataroa virus

Recombinants within this complex
Buggy Creek virus
Fort Morgan virus
Highlands J virus
Western equine encephalitis virus

Unclassified

Eilat virus
Mwinilunga alphavirus
Salmonid Alphavirus
Southern elephant seal virus
Tonate virus
Caaingua virus

=== Notes ===
Barmah Forest virus is related to the Semliki Forest virus. Middelburg virus, although classified as a separate complex, may be a member of the Semliki Forest virus group.

It seems likely that the genus evolved in the Old World from an insect-borne plant virus.

Sindbis virus may have originated in South America. The equine encephalitis viruses and the Sindbis virus are related.

The Old World and New World viruses appears to have diverged between 2000 and 3000 years ago. Divergence between the Venezuelan equine encephalitis virus and the eastern equine virus appears to have been ~1400 years ago.

The fish infecting clade appears to be basal to the other species.

The southern elephant seal virus appears to be related to the Sinbis clade.

== Pathogenesis and immune response ==
Medically important alphaviruses
Virus	Human Disease	Vertebrate Reservoir	Distribution
Barmah Forest virus	Fever, malaise, rash, joint pain, muscle tenderness	Humans	Australia
Chikungunya virus	Rash, arthritis	Primates, humans	Africa, Latin America, India, SE Asia
Eastern equine encephalitis virus	Encephalitis	Birds	Americas
Mayaro virus	Rash, arthritis	Primates, humans	South America
O'nyong'nyong virus	Rash, arthritis	Primates, Humans	Africa
Ross River virus	Rash, arthritis	Mammals, humans	Australia, South Pacific
Semliki Forest virus	Rash, arthritis	Birds	Africa
Sindbis virus	Rash, arthritis	Birds	Europe, Africa, Australia
Tonate virus	Encephalitis	Humans	South America
Una virus	Rash, arthritis	Primates, humans	South America
Venezuelan equine encephalitis virus	Encephalitis	Rodents, horses	Americas
Western equine encephalitis virus	Encephalitis	Birds, mammals	North America

There are many alphaviruses distributed around the world with the ability to cause human disease. Infectious arthritis, encephalitis, rashes and fever are the most commonly observed symptoms. Larger mammals such as humans and horses are usually dead-end hosts or play a minor role in viral transmission; however, in the case of Venezuelan equine encephalitis the virus is mainly amplified in horses. In most other cases the virus is maintained in nature in mosquitoes, rodents and birds.

Terrestrial alphavirus infections are spread by insect vectors such as mosquitoes. Once a human is bitten by the infected mosquito, the virus can gain entry into the bloodstream, causing viremia. The alphavirus can also get into the CNS where it is able to grow and multiply within the neurones. This can lead to encephalitis, which can be fatal.

When an individual is infected with this particular virus, its immune system can play a role in clearing away the virus particles. Alphaviruses are able to cause the production of interferons. Antibodies and T cells are also involved. The neutralizing antibodies also play an important role to prevent further infection and spread.

== Diagnosis, prevention, and control ==
Diagnoses is based on clinical samples from which the virus can be easily isolated and identified. There are no alphavirus vaccines currently available. Vector control with repellents, protective clothing, breeding site destruction, and spraying are the preventive measures of choice.

== Use of alphaviruses for gene therapy and vaccination ==
Alphaviruses are of interest to gene therapy researchers, in particular the Ross River virus, Sindbis virus, Semliki Forest virus, and Venezuelan equine encephalitis virus have all been used to develop viral vectors for gene delivery. Of particular interest are the chimeric viruses that may be formed with alphaviral envelopes and retroviral capsids. Such chimeras are termed pseudotyped viruses. Alphaviral envelope pseudotypes of retroviruses or lentiviruses are able to integrate the genes that they carry into the expansive range of potential host cells that are recognized and infected by the alphaviral envelope proteins E2 and E1. The stable integration of viral genes is mediated by the retroviral interiors of these vectors.

There are limitations to the use of alphaviruses in the field of gene therapy due to their lack of targeting, however, through the introduction of variable antibody domains in a non-conserved loop in the structure of E2, specific populations of cells have been targeted. Furthermore, the use of whole alphaviruses for gene therapy is of limited efficacy both because several internal alphaviral proteins are involved in the induction of apoptosis upon infection and also because the alphaviral capsid mediates only the transient introduction of mRNA into host cells. Neither of these limitations extend to alphaviral envelope pseudotypes of retroviruses or lentiviruses. However, the expression of Sindbis virus envelopes may lead to apoptosis, and their introduction into host cells upon infection by Sindbis virus envelope pseudotyped retroviruses may also lead to cell death. The toxicity of Sindbis viral envelopes may be the cause of the very low production titers realized from packaging cells constructed to produce Sindbis pseudotypes.

Another branch of research involving alphaviruses is in vaccination. Alphaviruses can be engineered to create replicon vectors which efficiently induce humoral and T-cell immune responses. In these contexts, replicons have been termed self-amplifying RNA. The replicons lack the ability to transmit to new cells as they lack the sequences encoding for structural proteins, which are replaced with a gene of interest such as an antigen for generation of immunity against a disease. They could therefore be used to vaccinate against viral, bacterial, protozoan, and tumor antigens.

== History ==
Initially, the Togaviridae family included what are now called the Flaviviruses, within the Alphavirus genus. The flaviviruses were formed into their own family when sufficient differences with the alphaviruses were noted due to the development of sequencing. Rubella virus was formerly included in the family Togaviridae in its own genus Rubivirus, but is now classified in its own family Matonaviridae. Alphavirus is now the sole genus in the family.

- 1930 – Western equine encephalitis virus is first isolated in the United States (the first alphavirus ever isolated)
- 1933 – Eastern equine encephalitis virus is first isolated in the United States.
- 1938 – Venezuelan equine encephalitis is isolated.
- 1941 – Western equine encephalitis epidemic is seen in the United States. It affects 300,000 horses and 3,336 humans.
- 1941 – Norman Gregg notices large number of children with cataracts following a rubella outbreak. This and other defects are then categorized under the congenital rubella syndrome.
- 1942 – Semliki Forest virus is isolated in Buliyama, Bwamba County, Uganda.
- 1952 – Sindbis virus is isolated in the Sindbis health district, 40 mi (64 km) north of Cairo, Egypt.
- 1954 – Mayaro virus is detected in forest workers from Mayaro–Rio Claro region, Trinidad and Tobago.
- 1959 – Ross River virus is isolated from Aedes vigilax mosquitoes (now known as Ochlerotatus vigilax) which were trapped at the Ross River in Australia.
- 1963 – Ross River virus, which causes epidemic polyarthritis (mostly seen in Australia), is isolated by Doherty and colleagues.
- 1971 – Last epidemic of Venezuelan equine encephalitis is seen in horses in southern Texas.
- 1986 – Barmah Forest virus is identified as causing human disease in Australia.
- 2001 – Scientists solved the crystal structure of the glycoprotein shell of the Semliki Forest virus.
- 2005–2006 – Large epidemic of the chikungunya virus on the island of La Réunion and the surrounding islands in the Indian Ocean
- 2006 – Major epidemic of the chikungunya virus in India with over 1.5 million cases reported

== See also ==
- Alphavirus infection

== Sources ==
- "Arboviruses". Virology-online.
- "ICTV Sources". ICTV. Archived from the original on 12 February 2006.
- Smerdou, C.; Liljestrom, P. (2000). "Alphavirus vectors: from protein production to gene therapy". Gene Therapy and Regulation. 1 (1): 33–63. doi:10.1163/156855800744520. ISSN 1568-5586.
- Rayner JO, Dryga SA, Kamrud KI (2002). "Alphavirus vectors and vaccination". Reviews in Medical Virology. 12 (5): 279–96. doi:10.1002/rmv.360. PMID 12211042. S2CID 21432844.
- Rhême, Céline; Ehrengruber, Markus U.; Grandgirard, Denis (2005). "Alphaviral cytotoxicity and its implication in vector development". Experimental Physiology. 90 (1): 45–52. doi:10.1113/expphysiol.2004.028142. PMID 15542620.
- Schmaljohn, Alan L.; McClain, David (1996). "54. Alphaviruses (Togaviridae) and Flaviviruses (Flaviviridae)". In Baron, Samuel (ed.). Medical Microbiology (4th ed.). University of Texas Medical Branch at Galveston. ISBN 0-9631172-1-1. PMID 21413253. NBK7633.
