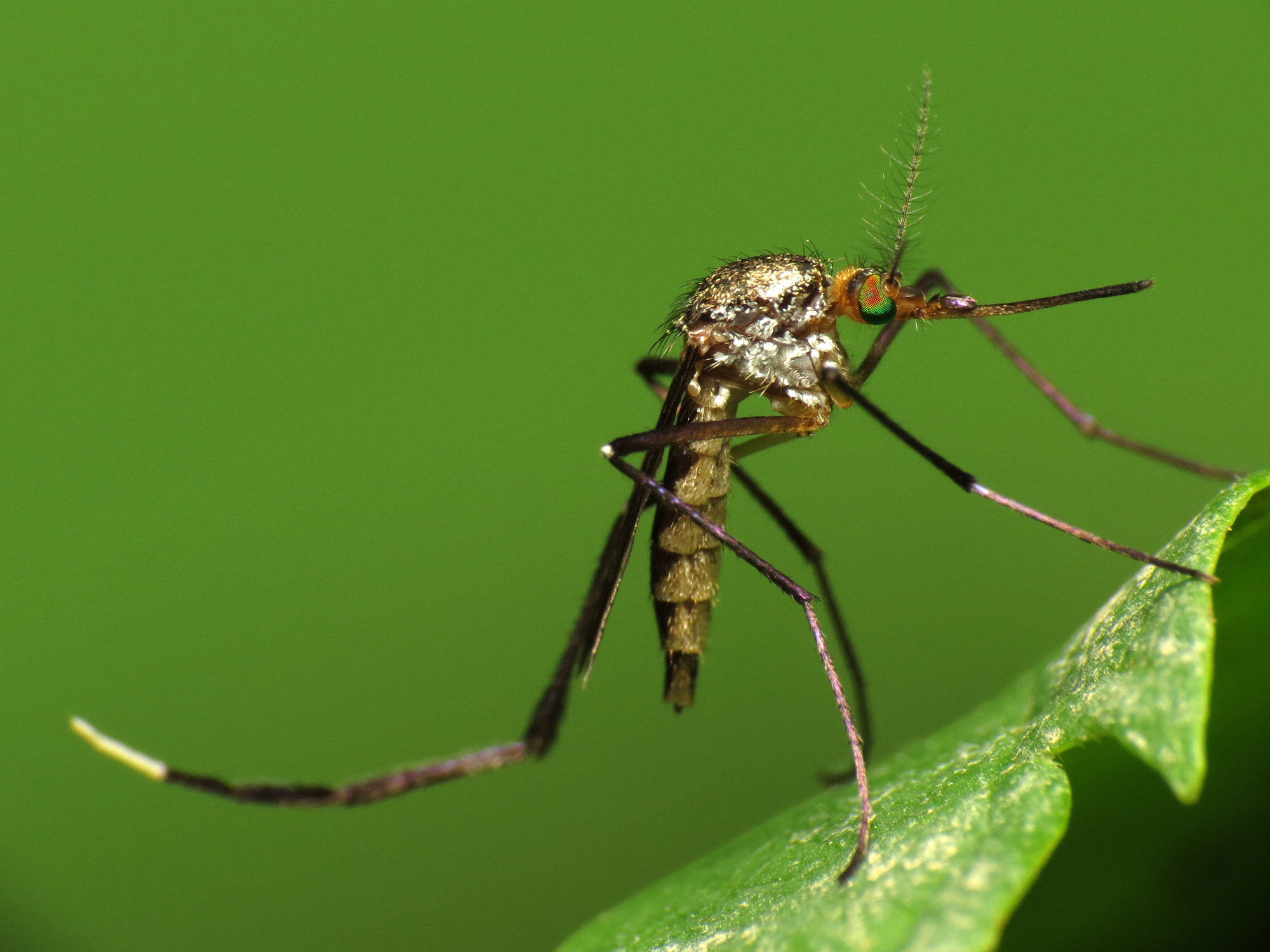
- Female Psorophora ferox

Scientific classification
- Kingdom: Animalia
- Phylum: Arthropoda
- Clade: Pancrustacea
- Class: Insecta
- Order: Diptera
- Family: Culicidae
- Genus: Psorophora
- Species: P. ferox

Binomial name
- Psorophora ferox (von Humboldt, 1819)

Synonyms
- Culex ferox von Humboldt, 1819; Culex posticatus Wiedemann, 1821; Culex musicus Say (not Leach), 1827; Janthinosoma echinata Grabham, 1906; Janthinosoma vanhalli Dyar and Knab, 1906; Janthinosoma terminalis Coquillett, 1906; Janthinosoma sayi Dyar and Knab, 1906; Janthinosoma sayi Theobald, 1907; Janthinosoma coquilletti Theobald, 1907; Janthinosoma sayi var. jamaicensis Theobald, 1907; Aedes pazosi Pazos, 1908; Janthinosoma centrale Brèthes, 1910

= Psorophora ferox =

Species of fly

Psorophora ferox is a medium-sized mosquito native to much of North and South America. It inhabits wet woodlands, laying its eggs in temporary pools filled with rainwater. Larvae develop during summer in North America. They are aggressive feeders and give painful bites. The mosquito is reported to be active during both day and night.

== Description ==
The adult's thorax is covered in dark scales with flecks of lighter yellowish scales. The abdomen is mostly dark-scaled dorsally, and yellowish ventrally. These yellowish scales form apicolateral triangular patches. The dorsum reflects a purple color. The legs are largely dark with white scales on the last two tarsal segments. The female's wings range from around 3.7 to 4.0 mm. The proboscis is long and dark.

== Range ==
Ps. ferox occurs throughout the eastern United States and southeastern Canada, south through Mexico, Central and South America, and the Caribbean.

== Medical significance ==
Ps. ferox carries a number of diseases, although it is not considered a major vector. It is known to carry Venezuelan equine encephalitis virus (VEE). It was found to be a minor vector of West Nile virus (WNV) in New York. Several viruses have been found in this mosquito in the Amazon, such as Una virus and Ilheus virus. In Central and South America, the mosquito carries the larvae of Dermatobia hominis, the human bot fly, a parasite whose larvae develop inside the flesh of a mammal host.
