= HJV =

HJV may refer to:

- Home Guard (Denmark) (Hjemmeværnet)
- Hemojuvelin
- Highlands J virus
