= Pogosta disease =

- Other names: Karelian fever, Ockelbo disease
- Specialty: Infectious disease

Pogosta disease is a viral disease. The symptoms of the disease usually include rash, as well as mild fever and other flu-like symptoms; in most cases the symptoms last less than 5 days. However, in some cases, the patients develop a painful arthritis. There are no known chemical agents available to treat the disease.

== Signs and symptoms ==
The majority of cases have only mild symptoms, or none, and may therefore go undetected. Typical symptoms include fever, muscle pain, and skin rash. In more severe cases, infection leads to arthritis-like symptoms, with joint pain especially in ankles, wrists and fingers; this can last for months or even years, but will resolve eventually.

== Cause ==
It has long been suspected that the disease is caused by a Sindbis-like virus, a positive-stranded RNA virus belonging to the Alphavirus genus and family Togaviridae. In 2002 a strain of Sindbis was isolated from patients during an outbreak of the Pogosta disease in Finland, confirming the hypothesis.The virus is likely transmitted to humans by mosquitoes from wild Galliformes.

== Prevention ==
There is no vaccine for Pogosta disease, but protection from mosquito bites is helpful as a preventative measure. Contracting the disease provides immunity against subsequent infections.

== Treatment ==
Treatment consists of easing the symptoms.

== Epidemiology ==
This disease is mainly found in the Eastern parts of Finland; the disease was first detected in 1974 in the old parish village of Ilomantsi, sometimes called Pogosta. A typical Pogosta disease patient is a middle-aged person who has been infected through a mosquito bite while picking berries in the autumn. The prevalence of the disease is about 100 diagnosed cases every year, with larger outbreaks occurring in 7-year intervals.

== Etymology ==
It is also known as Karelian fever and Ockelbo disease. The names are derived from the words Pogosta, Karelia and Ockelbo.
