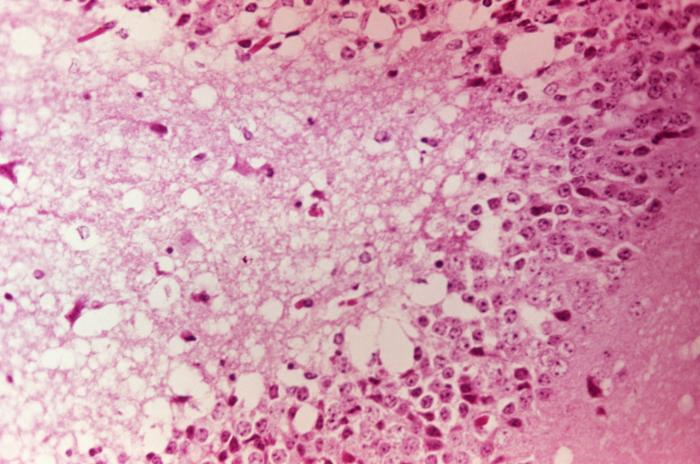

Virus classification
- (unranked): Virus
- Realm: Riboviria
- Kingdom: Orthornavirae
- Phylum: Kitrinoviricota
- Class: Alsuviricetes
- Order: Martellivirales
- Family: Togaviridae
- Genus: Alphavirus
- Species: Alphavirus venezuelan

= Venezuelan equine encephalitis virus =

Species of virus

Venezuelan equine encephalitis virus
- Specialty: Infectious disease

Venezuelan equine encephalitis virus is a mosquito-borne viral pathogen which causes Venezuelan equine encephalitis or encephalomyelitis (VEE). VEE can affect all equine species, such as horses, donkeys, and zebras. After infection, affected mammals may suddenly die or show progressive central nervous system disorders. Humans also can contract this disease. Healthy adults who become infected by the virus may experience flu-like symptoms, such as high fevers and headaches. People with weakened immune systems and the young and the elderly can become severely ill or die from the disease.

Venezuelan Equine Encephalitis is vector-borne, and the virus that causes VEE is transmitted primarily by Culex mosquitoes, which bite an infected animal and then bite and feed on another animal or human. The speed with which the disease spreads depends on the subtype of the VEE virus and the density of mosquito populations.

Enzootic subtypes of VEE are diseases endemic to certain areas. Generally these serotypes do not spread to other localities. Enzootic subtypes are associated with the rodent-mosquito transmission cycle. These forms of the virus can cause human illness but generally do not affect equine health.

Epizootic subtypes, on the other hand, can spread rapidly through large populations. These forms of the virus are highly pathogenic to equine populations, and can also affect human health. Equine animals, rather than rodents, are the primary species which carry and spread the disease. Infected equine animals develop an enormous quantity of virus in their circulatory system. When a blood-feeding insect feeds on such animals, it picks up this virus and transmits it to other animals or humans. Although other animals — such as cattle, swine, and dogs — can be infected, they are generally asymptomatic, do not show signs of the disease, and do not contribute to its spread.

The VEE virion is spherical, and approximately 70 nm in diameter. It has a lipid membrane with glycoprotein surface proteins spread around the outside. Surrounding the nuclear material is a nucleocapsid that has an icosahedral symmetry of T = 4, and is approximately 40 nm in diameter.

== Viral subtypes ==
Serology testing performed on this virus has shown the presence of six different subtypes (classified I to VI). These have been given names, including Mucambo, Tonate, and Pixuna subtypes. There are seven different variants in subtype I, and three of these variants, A, B, and C are the epizootic strains.

The Mucambo virus (subtype III) appears to have evolved ~1809 AD (95% credible interval: 1559–1944). In Venezuela the Mucambo subtype was identified in 1975 by Jose Esparza and J. Sánchez using cultured mosquito cells.

== Epidemiology ==
In the Americas, there have been 21 reported outbreaks of Venezuelan equine encephalitis virus. Outbreaks occurred in Central American and South American countries. This virus was isolated in 1938, and outbreaks have been reported in many different countries since then. Mexico, Colombia, Venezuela, and the United States are just some of the countries that have reported outbreaks. Outbreaks of VEE generally occur after periods of heavy precipitation that cause mosquito populations to thrive.

Between December 1992 and January 1993, the Venezuelan state of Trujillo experienced an outbreak of this virus. Overall, 28 cases of the disease were reported along with 12 deaths. June 1993 saw a bigger outbreak in the Venezuelan state of Zulia, as 55 humans died as well as 66 equine deaths.

A much larger outbreak in Venezuela and Colombia occurred in 1995. On 23 May 1995, equine encephalitis-like cases were reported in the northwest portion of Venezuela. Eventually, the outbreak spread more towards the north as well as to the south. From the start of the outbreak to 31 October, about 11,390 febrile cases in humans as well as 16 deaths were reported. About 500 equine cases were reported with 475 deaths. In Colombia, 14,156 human cases and 26 deaths were reported.

An outbreak of this disease occurred in Colombia in September 1995. This outbreak resulted in 14,156 human cases that were attributable to Venezuelan equine encephalitis virus with 26 human deaths. A possible explanation for the serious outbreaks was the particularly heavy rain that had fallen. This could have caused increased numbers of mosquitoes that could serve as vectors for the disease. A more likely explanation is that deforestation caused a change in mosquito species. Culex taenopius mosquitos, which prefer rodents, were replaced by Aedes taeniorhynchus mosquitoes, which are more likely to bite humans and large equines.

Though the majority of VEE outbreaks occur in Central and South America, the virus has potential to outbreak again in the United States. It has been shown the invasive mosquito species Aedes albopictus is a viable carrier of VEE virus.

== Treatment ==
Oxatomide has shown antiviral activity against VEE virus in cell culture. Oxatomide is an over the counter drug and an H1 antihistamine. H1 antihistamines characteristically cause drowsiness (e.g., Benadryl) and cross the blood-brain barrier. To date, oxatomide has not been tested in humans or animals for the treatment of VEE. Oxatomide is still sold in Japan (Sawai Pharmaceutical).

== Vaccine ==
There is an inactivated vaccine containing the C-84 strain for VEE virus that is used to immunize horses. Another vaccine, containing the TC-83 strain, is used on humans in military and laboratory positions who risk contracting the virus. The human vaccine can result in side effects and does not fully immunize the patient. The TC-83 strain was generated by passing the virus 83 times through a guinea pig heart cell culture; C-84 is a derivative of TC-83. Alphaviral genomes lacking the full set of structural proteins are currently being used to produce self-amplifying mRNA vaccines and may be useful for delivering therapeutic enzymes and proteins in the future.

== Society and culture ==
In April 2009, the U.S. Army Medical Research Institute of Infectious Diseases at Fort Detrick reported that samples of Venezuelan equine encephalitis virus were discovered missing during an inventory of a group of samples left by a departed researcher. The report stated the samples were likely among those destroyed when a freezer malfunctioned.

=== Biological weapon ===
During the Cold War, both the United States biological weapons program and the Soviet biological weapons program researched and weaponized VEE. In his book Biohazard: The Chilling True Story of the Largest Covert Biological Weapons Program in the World, author Stephen Handelman details the weaponization of VEE and other biologicals including plague, anthrax, and smallpox, by Dr. Ken Alibek in the Cold War Soviet weapons programs.

== Notes ==
- APHIS. 1996. Venezuelan Equine Encephalomyelitis
- "PAHO: Equine Encephalitis in the Event of a Disaster".
- "PAHO Epidemiological Bulletin: Outbreak of Venezuelan Equine Encephalities".
- "PATHINFO: Venezuelan Equine Encephalitis Virus". Archived from the original on 2006-08-28.
- "Army: 3 vials of virus samples missing from Maryland facility". CNN. 2009-04-22.
