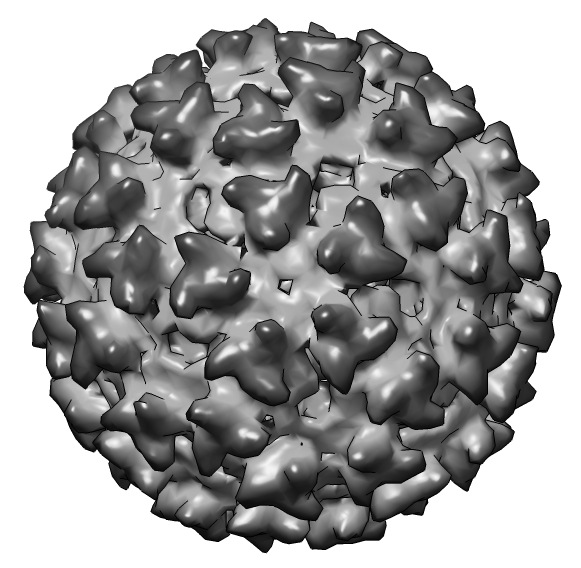
- CryoEM model of Sindbis virus. EMDB entry EMD-2374

Virus classification
- (unranked): Virus
- Realm: Riboviria
- Kingdom: Orthornavirae
- Phylum: Kitrinoviricota
- Class: Alsuviricetes
- Order: Martellivirales
- Family: Togaviridae
- Genus: Alphavirus
- Species: Alphavirus sindbis

= Sindbis virus =

Species of virus

Sindbis virus (SINV) is a member of the Togaviridae family, in the Alphavirus genus. The virus was first isolated in 1952 in Cairo, Egypt. The virus is transmitted by mosquitoes (Culex and Culiseta). SINV is linked to Pogosta disease (Finland), Ockelbo disease (Sweden) and Karelian fever (Russia). In humans, the symptoms include arthralgia, rash and malaise. Sindbis virus is widely and continuously found in insects and vertebrates in Eurasia, Africa, and Oceania. Clinical infection and disease in humans however has almost only been reported from Northern Europe (Finland, Sweden, Russian Karelia), where SINV is endemic and where large outbreaks occur intermittently. Cases are occasionally reported in Australia, China, and South Africa.

SINV is an arbovirus, it is arthropod-borne, and it is maintained in nature by transmission between vertebrate (bird) hosts and invertebrate (mosquito) vectors. Humans are infected with Sindbis virus when bitten by an infected mosquito.

== Virus physiology ==
=== Structure, genome and replication ===
Sindbis viruses are enveloped particles with an icosahedral capsid, with a positive single stranded RNA genome, with an approximate size of 11.7 kb. The RNA has a 5'-cap and 3'-polyadenylated tail, and therefore serves directly as messenger RNA (mRNA) in a host cell. The genome encodes four non-structural proteins, the capsid, and two envelope proteins. This is characteristic of all Togaviruses. Replication is cytoplasmic and rapid. The genomic RNA is partially translated at the 5' end to produce the non-structural proteins which are then involved in genome replication and the production of new genomic RNA and a shorter sub-genomic RNA strand. This sub-genomic strand is translated into the structural proteins. The viruses assemble at the host cell surfaces and acquire their envelope through budding.

A non-coding RNA element has been found to be essential for Sindbis virus genome replication.

Recombination has been demonstrated between RNAs of Sindbis virus. The mechanism of recombination appears to be template switching (copy choice) during RNA replication.

== See also ==
- Alphavirus infection
