= EM Data Bank =

European biological database

EMDataBank.org
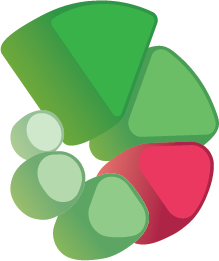

Content
- Description: 3DEM archiving and wwPDB core member

Contact
- Research centre: Electron Microscopy Data Bank (EMDB) EMBL European Bioinformatics Institute
- Primary citation: wwPDB Consortium (2024)
- Release date: 2002

Access
- Website: www.emdatabank.org www.ebi.ac.uk/about/teams/electron-microscopy-data-bank/
- Download URL: ftp.ebi.ac.uk/pub/databases/emdb/

Tools
- Standalone: www.ebi.ac.uk/emdb/api/

The EM Data Bank or Electron Microscopy Data Bank (EMDB) collects 3DEM maps and associated experimental data determined using electron microscopy of biological specimens. It was established in 2002 at the MSD/PDBe group of the European Bioinformatics Institute (EBI), where the European site of the EMDataBank.org consortium is located. As of 2025, the resource contained over 50,000 3DEM map entries with a mean resolution of 7.6 Å, reflecting the growth of the field since 2015 where 2,600 entries had a mean resolution of 15 Å.

Deposition of data was originally via the EMdep deposition interface, but since 2016 deposition of data has been incorporated into the wwPDB OneDep interface.

Under the NIH Unified Data Resource for CryoEM, the Research Collaboration for Structural Biology (RCSB) also acts as a deposition, data processing and distribution center for EMDB data, while the National Center for Macromolecular Imaging (NCMI) is a collaborative partner in providing services and tools concerning the EMDB.

EM Data Bank also provides the EMsearch search tool and data can also be queried at RCSB, EMBL-EBI and PDBj.

EMDB is an archive for three-dimensional density maps of all types of biological assemblies, including ribosomes, chaperones, polymerases, multifunctional enzymes and viruses. Viper EMDB at Scripps is a separate database for three-dimensional EM maps of viruses.

To compare and assess methods for the new generation of higher resolution (better than 5Å) structures, the EMDB has hosted the first CryoEM Map Challenge and CryoEM Model Challenge, reported in a special issue of the Journal of Structural Biology.

== See also ==
- Cryo-Electron Microscopy
- Colocalization Benchmark Source

== Bibliography ==
- Tagari, Mohamed; Newman, Richard; Chagoyen, Monica; Carazo, Jose-Maria; Henrick, Kim (2002). "New electron microscopy database and deposition system". Trends in Biochemical Sciences. 27 (11): 589. doi:10.1016/s0968-0004(02)02176-x. PMID 12417136.
- Fuller, Stephen D. (2003). "Depositing electron microscopy maps". Structure. 11 (1): 11–12. doi:10.1016/s0969-2126(02)00942-5. PMID 12517335.
- Henrick, K; Newman, R; Tagari, M; Chagoyenb, M (2003). "EMDep: a web-based system for the deposition and validation of high-resolution electron microscopy macromolecular structural information". Journal of Structural Biology. 144 (1–2): 228–237. doi:10.1016/j.jsb.2003.09.009. PMID 14643225.
- Heymann, J. Bernard; Chagoyen, Mónica; Belnap, David M. (2005). "Common conventions for interchange and archiving of three-dimensional electron microscopy information in structural biology". Journal of Structural Biology. 151 (2): 196–207. doi:10.1016/j.jsb.2005.06.001. PMID 16043364.
- Tagari, M.; Tate, J.; Swaminathan, G. J.; et al. (2006). "E-MSD: improving data deposition and structure quality". Nucleic Acids Research. 34 (Database issue): 287–290. doi:10.1093/nar/gkj163. PMC 1347525. PMID 16381867.
