= Martellivirales =

Virus classification
- (unranked): Virus
- Realm: Riboviria
- Kingdom: Orthornavirae
- Phylum: Kitrinoviricota
- Class: Alsuviricetes
- Order: Martellivirales

Order of viruses

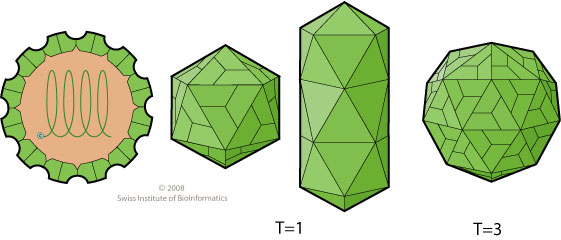
Illustration of different types of virion found in Bromoviridae, a family in the order Martellivirales

Martellivirales is an order of viruses.

== Taxonomy ==
The following families are recognized:

- Bromoviridae
- Closteroviridae
- Endornaviridae
- Kitaviridae
- Mayoviridae
- Tobaliviridae
- Togaviridae
- Virgaviridae
