= Alsuviricetes =

Virus classification
- (unranked): Virus
- Realm: Riboviria
- Kingdom: Orthornavirae
- Phylum: Kitrinoviricota
- Class: Alsuviricetes

Class of viruses

Alsuviricetes is a class of positive-strand RNA viruses which infect eukaryotes. The name of the group is a syllabic abbreviation of "alpha supergroup" with the suffix -viricetes indicating a virus class.

== Taxonomy ==
The following orders are recognized:

- Hepelivirales
- Martellivirales
- Tymovirales
