= Kitrinoviricota =

Virus classification
- (unranked): Virus
- Realm: Riboviria
- Kingdom: Orthornavirae
- Phylum: Kitrinoviricota

Classes
- See text

Phylum of viruses

Kitrinoviricota is a phylum of RNA viruses that includes all positive-strand RNA viruses that infect eukaryotes and are not members of the phylum Pisuviricota or Lenarviricota. The name of the group derives from Greek κίτρινος (kítrinos), which means yellow (a reference to yellow fever virus), and -viricota, which is the suffix for a virus phylum.

== Classes ==
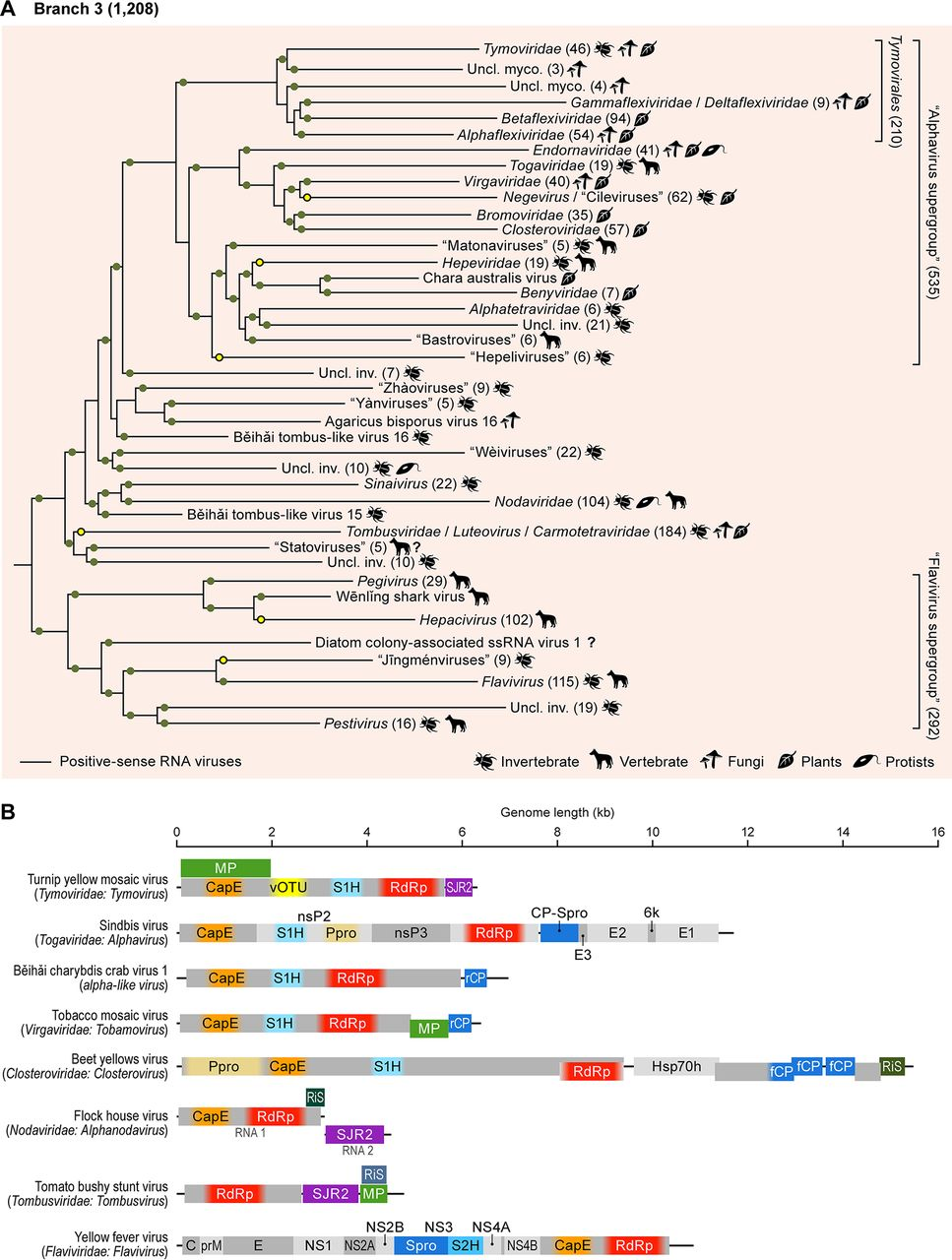
Phylogenetic tree of Kitrinoviricota (top), genome of different members and major conserved proteins (bottom)

The following classes are recognized:

- Alsuviricetes
- Flasuviricetes
- Magsaviricetes
- Tolucaviricetes
