= Yellow (disambiguation) =

Yellow is a color.

Yellow may also refer to:

== Biology ==
- Clouded yellow, a common name for a butterfly in genus Colias
- Grass yellow, a common name for a butterfly in genus Eurema
- Yellow, a common name for a butterfly in subfamily Coliadinae

== Books and comics ==
- Yellow (short story collection), a short-story collection by Don Lee
- Yellow (manga), a 2002 yaoi manga by Makoto Tateno
- Yellow: Race in America Beyond Black and White, a book by Frank H. Wu
- Yellow (Pokémon Adventures), a character in Pokémon Adventures

== Film and television ==
- Yellow (1997 film), a film written and directed by Chris Chan Lee
- Yellow (2006 feature film), a film starring Roselyn Sanchez
- Yellow (2006 short film), a film by director Neill Blomkamp
- "Yellow", an episode of Tales from the Crypt
- Yellow (2012 film), starring Sienna Miller, Ben Foster, Riley Keough and Lucy Punch
- Yellow (2014 film), an Indian Marathi film directed by Mahesh Limaye
- "Yellow", an episode from the TV series Teletubbies

== Games ==
- Pokémon Yellow version, the fourth (and final) installment in the first generation of Pokémon games
- Yellow Squadron, a rival ace squadron in Ace Combat 4
- Yellow, a character in the video game Deltarune

== Music ==
=== Performers ===
- Yello, a Swiss electronic duo
- Yellow, a member of the South Korean group Pungdeng-E

=== Albums ===
- Yellow (Brymo album), 2020
- Yellow (Scandal album), 2016
- The Yellow, an EP by Lemon Jelly, 1999
- Zebrahead (album) or Yellow, by Zebrahead, 1998
- Yellow, by Calema, 2020
- Yellow (EP), by South Korean singer/songwriter Kang Daniel, 2021
- Yellow, an EP by Asikey, 2020
- Yellow, by Emma-Jean Thackray, 2021

=== Songs ===
- "Yellow" (Coldplay song), 2000
- "Yellow" (Kaela Kimura song), 2007
- "Yellow", by Aminé from Good for You, 2017
- "Yellow", by Tyler, the Creator from Cherry Bomb, 2015
- "Yellow", by For the Fallen Dreams from Back Burner, 2011
- "Yellow", by Nicholas Tse, 2005
- "Yellow", by Rich Brian from The Sailor, 2019
- "Yellow", by Robin Schulz from Sugar, 2015
- "Yellow", by Sheila E. from Romance 1600, 1985
- "Yellow", by Yann Tiersen from the Tabarly soundtrack, 1998
- "Yellow", by Tegan and Sara from Crybaby, 2022

== Other uses ==
- High yellow, skin pigmentation
- Yellow (clothing), a Bangladesh-based fashion brand and retailer
- Yellow Corporation, a defunct United States freight company
- Yubo, formerly Yellow, a social media app
- Yellow (convenience store), an Israeli chain operated by Paz Oil Company Ltd.
- Yellow, a play by Del Shores
- FD&C Yellow 5, the food coloring tartrazine
- YellOw (gamer), South Korean former professional StarCraft player

== See also ==
- Yellow Creek (disambiguation)
- Yellow Line (disambiguation)
- Yellow River (disambiguation)
- Yellow Submarine (disambiguation)
- Yellows (disambiguation)
