= Yellow Creek =

Yellow Creek may refer to:

== Settlements ==
Canada

- Yellow Creek, Saskatchewan

United States

- Yellow Creek, Illinois
- Yellow Creek, Bell County, Kentucky
- Middlesboro, Kentucky, formerly Yellow Creek
- Yellow Creek Township, Chariton County, Missouri
- Yellow Creek, Ohio
- Yellow Creek Township, Columbiana County, Ohio

== Streams ==
Canada

- Yellow Creek (Toronto), a tributary of the Don River, Ontario

United States

- Yellow Creek (Alabama), a tributary of Luxapallila Creek
- Yellow Creek (Colorado), a tributary of the White River
- Yellow Creek (Chestatee River tributary), Georgia
- Yellow Creek (Illinois), a tributary of the Pecatonica River
- Yellow Creek (Michigan), a stream in Berrien County
- Yellow Creek (Grand River tributary), Missouri
- Yellow Creek (Ohio), a river of Ohio
  - Yellow Creek State Forest
- Yellow Creek (Juniata River tributary), Pennsylvania
- Yellow Creek (Two Lick Creek tributary), Pennsylvania
  - Yellow Creek State Park
- Yellow Creek (South Dakota), a tributary of Whitewood Creek
- Yellow Creek (Utah), in Bryce Canyon National Park

== See also ==
- Yellow River (disambiguation)
