= Yelo =

Yelo may refer to:

- Yelo, Russia, rural locality in Ongudaysky District, the Altai Republic, Russia
- Yelo, Spain, municipality located in the province of Soria, Castile and León, Spain
- Yelo (influencer) (born 1996), Macanese influencer
- 2021–22 Saudi First Division League, known as the Yelo League for sponsorship reasons

== See also ==
- Yello, Swiss electronic music band
- Yalo (disambiguation)
- Yellow (disambiguation)
