= Yellows =

Yellows may refer to:

- Shades of yellow
- Yellow

== Butterflies ==
- Coliadinae
- Clouded yellows, a common name for Colias, a genus of butterflies
- Grass yellows, a common name for Eurema, a genus of butterflies

== Phytoplasmas and phytoplasma-related diseases ==
- Aster yellows, a yellowing disease that affects plants in the aster family
- Elm yellows, a yellowing disease that affects elm trees
- Grapevine yellows, a yellowing disease that affects grape plants
- Milkweed yellows phytoplasma, a phytoplasma that infects milkweeds

== Plant viruses ==
- Abutilon yellows virus, a plant virus that is transmitted by a fly
- Beet yellows virus, a plant virus that causes a yellowing disease in various species of beet and spinach
- Cucumber yellows virus, a plant virus that causes a yellowing disease in various species of cucumber and melon

== See also ==
- Yellow (disambiguation)
