= Yalo (disambiguation) =

Yalo was a Palestinian village.

Yalo may also refer to:

- Yalo (Ethiopian District), district of the Afar Region, Ethiopia
- Yalo Cuéllar (born 1963), Bolivian composer and musician
- Tropical Cyclone Yalo, storm in the 2015–16 South Pacific cyclone season
- Yalo (company) sales platform

== See also ==
- Yelo (disambiguation)
- Yallo, village in the town of Sipilou in the far west of Ivory Coast
- Yallo, town in the Bomborokui Department of Kossi Province in western Burkina Faso
