= Yellow River (disambiguation) =

The Yellow River is the second longest river in China.

Yellow River may also refer to:

- Xar Moron, a river in northeastern China
- Yellow River (County Leitrim), Ireland
- Yellow River (County Offaly), Ireland
- Yellow River (Papua New Guinea)
- The Yellow River languages of Papua New Guinea
- Hwang River, South Korea

== In the United States ==
- Yellow River (Pensacola Bay), which rises in Alabama and empties into the Gulf Coast of Florida
- Yellow River (Georgia)
- Yellow River (Indiana)
- Yellow River (Iowa)
- four streams named Yellow River in Wisconsin:
  - Yellow River (Chippewa River)
  - Yellow River (Red Cedar River)
  - Yellow River (St. Croix River tributary)
  - Yellow River (Wisconsin River tributary)
- a former name for the Missouri River in Kansas
- Yellow River, a former name for a tributary of the Kuskokwim River in Aniak, Alaska, USA, and namesake of the Yellow River Stampede, a gold rush in 1900–1901

== Music ==
- "Yellow River" (song), a 1970 song by Christie
- Yellow River Piano Concerto

== See also ==
- Yellow Creek (disambiguation)
- Saryozen
