= 2015–16 South Pacific cyclone season =

Tropical cyclone season

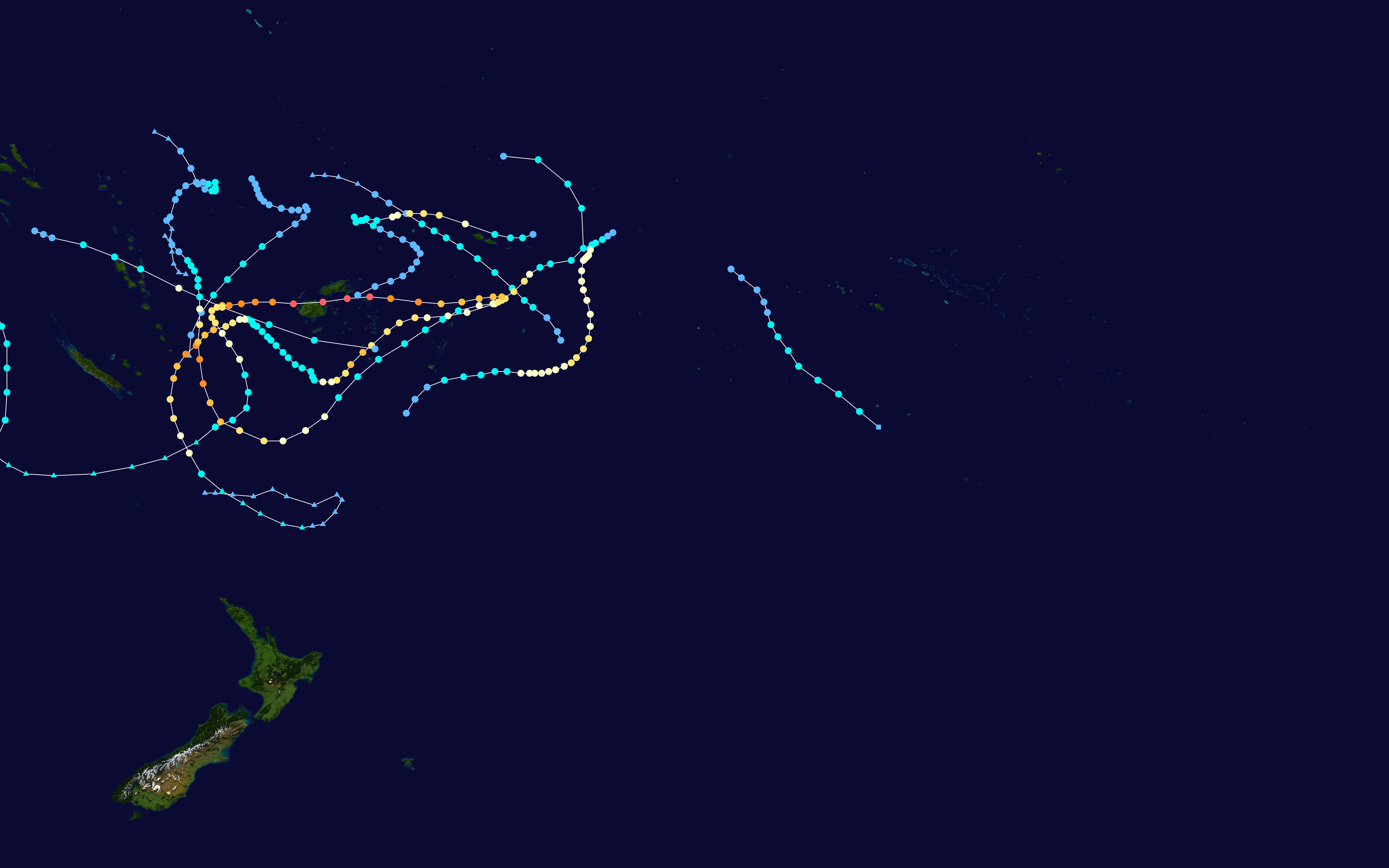
- Season summary map

Seasonal boundaries
- First system formed: July 29, 2015
- Last system dissipated: April 27, 2016

Strongest storm
- Name: Winston (Most intense tropical cyclone in the Southern Hemisphere)
  - Maximum winds: 280 km/h (175 mph) (10-minute sustained)
  - Lowest pressure: 884 hPa (mbar)

Seasonal statistics
- Total disturbances: 18 (Note: Number of tropical lows and tropical cyclones excludes Tropical Cyclone Raquel, which was considered to have been a part of the 2014–15 season.)
- Total depressions: 11
- Tropical cyclones: 8
- Severe tropical cyclones: 5
- Total fatalities: 50 total
- Total damage: $1.4 billion (2015 USD) (Second-costliest South Pacific cyclone season recorded)

Related articles
- 2015–16 Australian region cyclone season; 2015–16 South-West Indian Ocean cyclone season

The 2015–16 South Pacific cyclone season was one of the most disastrous South Pacific tropical cyclone seasons on record, with a total of 50 deaths and $1.405 billion (2016 USD) in damage. Throughout the season, 8 systems attained tropical cyclone status, whilst 5 became severe tropical cyclones. The most notable cyclone of the season by far was Winston, which attained a minimum pressure of 884 hPa (mbar; 26.10 inHg), and maximum ten-minute sustained winds of 175 mph (280 km/h), making it the most intense tropical cyclone on record in the Southern Hemisphere. Winston went on to devastate Fiji, causing $1.4 billion (2016 USD) in damage and 44 deaths across the country.

The 2015–16 season marked the period of the year when most tropical cyclones form within the South Pacific Ocean to the east of 160°E. The season officially ran from November 1, 2015, to April 30, 2016, however a tropical cyclone could form at any time between July 1, 2015, and June 30, 2016, and would count towards the season total. During the season, tropical cyclones are officially monitored by the Fiji Meteorological Service and the Meteorological Service of New Zealand (MetService). Other warning centres like the Australian Bureau of Meteorology and the United States Joint Typhoon Warning Center (JTWC) will also monitor the basin. The FMS and MetService both use the Australian Tropical Cyclone Intensity Scale and estimate wind speeds over a period of ten minutes, while the JTWC estimated sustained winds over a 1-minute period, which are subsequently compared to the Saffir–Simpson hurricane wind scale (SSHWS).

== Seasonal forecasts ==
Source/Record	Tropical Cyclone	Severe Tropical Cyclone	Ref
Record high:	1997–98: 16	1982–83: 10	
Record low:	2011–12: 3	2008–09: 0	
Average (1969–70 – 2014–15):	7.3	—	
Fiji Meteorological Service	10–14	4–8	
NIWA October	11–13	>6	
Region	Chance of above average	Average number	Actual activity
Western South Pacific	15%	7	1
Eastern South Pacific	48%	10	7
Source:BOM's Seasonal Outlooks for Tropical Cyclones.

After the occurrences of Tropical Cyclone Raquel and Tropical Depression 01F during July and August 2015, the Fiji Meteorological Service (FMS) noted that the ongoing 2014–16 El Niño event, might mean that more tropical cyclones occur in the basin than usual during the season. It was also noted that during previous El Niño episodes the season started early, with systems developing before the start of the season on November 1. As a result, the FMS expected the tropical cyclone season to start during October 2015. During September 24, Météo-France announced that there was a 90% chance of either a moderate tropical storm, severe tropical storm or tropical cyclone, impacting the waters surrounding French Polynesia during the season. Ahead of the cyclone season, the FMS, the BoM, Météo-France, New Zealand's MetService and National Institute of Water and Atmospheric Research (NIWA) and various other Pacific Meteorological services, all contributed towards the Island Climate Update tropical cyclone outlook that was released during October 2015.

The outlook took into account the strong El Niño conditions that had been observed across the Pacific and analogue seasons that had ENSO neutral and weak El Niño conditions occurring during the season. The outlook called for an above average number of tropical cyclones for the 2015–16 season, with eleven to thirteen named tropical cyclones to occur between 135°E and 120°W compared to an average of 10–12. At least six of the tropical cyclones were expected to become category 3 severe tropical cyclones, while four could become category 4 severe tropical cyclones. It was also noted that Category 5 severe tropical cyclones, with 10-minute sustained windspeeds of 196 km/h (122 mph) were known to occur during El Niño events. In addition to contributing towards the Island Climate Update outlook the BoM and the FMS, issued their own seasonal forecasts for the South Pacific region. The BoM issued a seasonal forecast for both the Western and Eastern South Pacific. The Western region between 142.5°E and 165°E was predicted to have a 15% chance of having an above average number of tropical cyclones, while the Eastern region between 165°E and 120°W was predicted to have a 48% chance of having an above average number of tropical cyclones. Within their outlook the FMS predicted that between ten and fourteen tropical cyclones, would occur within the basin compared to an average of around 7.3 cyclones. Between four and eight of these tropical cyclones were expected to intensify into category 3 severe tropical cyclones, while 3-7 might intensify into Category 4 or 5 severe tropical cyclones. They also reported that the tropical cyclone genesis trough was expected to be displaced far eastwards of its long term average position. This was based on the expected and predicted ENSO conditions, and the existence of the Pacific warm pool of sub-surface temperature anomalies in this region.

Both the Island Climate Update and the FMS tropical cyclone outlooks assessed the risk of a tropical cyclone affecting a certain island or territory. As the tropical cyclone genesis trough of low pressure was expected to be located near to and to the east of the International Date Line, normal or slightly above normal activity was expected for areas near the dateline. With the exception of Kiribati, Papua New Guinea, New Caledonia, Niue, and Tonga, the Island Climate Update predicted that all areas would experience an elevated risk of being affected by multiple tropical cyclones. The FMS's outlook predicted that the Solomon and Northern Cook Islands, Wallis and Futuna, Tokelau, Samoa, and French Polynesia had a highly elevated chance of being affected by a tropical cyclone. Vanuatu, Fiji, Niue, and the Southern Cook Islands had an elevated risk, while a normal risk was anticipated for New Caledonia, Tuvalu, and Tonga.

== Seasonal summary ==
As the 2015–16 tropical cyclone year opened, Tropical Cyclone Raquel was active within the Australian region and affecting the Solomon Islands with heavy rain and high winds. The system subsequently moved into the basin as a weakening tropical depression during July 2, before it was last noted within the Australian region during July 5; it is considered a storm from the previous season, not of this season. Later that month RSMC Nadi started to monitor Tropical Disturbance 01F, which had developed to the north-northeast of Honiara in the Solomon Islands. Over the next few days the system slowly organised further, before it was classified as Tropical Cyclone 01P by the Joint Typhoon Warning Center, on August 2. In mid-October, Tropical Depression 02F formed. Despite being in a favorable environment, the weak storm dissipated on October 18. In late November, two systems formed in succession: Tropical Depressions 03F and 04F. 03F later strengthened into Tropical Cyclone Tuni. Both dissipated on December 2.

Later that month, the basin became more active, with Tropical Depressions 05F, 06F, and 07F forming just days apart. 05F later strengthened into Tropical Cyclone Ula, while 07F caused fatalities in the Solomon Islands. Ula subsequently weakened, but later rapidly re-intensified into a Category 4 severe tropical cyclone, reaching its peak intensity. Meanwhile, 06F developed to the north of Wallis Island, but was absorbed by Ula. Victor ended the first slew of storms, dissipating on January 24. Following this, the basin was dormant for three weeks; however, a slew of storms began forming in February. Winston led off the month, forming on February 7. Similar to Ula, the storm attained a preliminary peak, weakened, but later rapidly re-intensified into a Category 5 severe tropical cyclone, making landfall near Suva, Fiji, at peak strength. This made Winston the strongest tropical cyclone on record to impact Fiji. Winston then moved southwest, out of the basin, on February 26, dissipating on March 1. Cyclone Tatiana briefly moved into the basin on February 12, but dissipated the next day, as it exited the basin. Yalo and a tropical depression followed to this: Yalo dissipated on February 26, while 12F dissipated on March 1. The basin became dormant again as the season wound down. Despite this, Tropical Depression 13F formed on March 19, and dissipated three days later. The basin once again became dormant again, as the end of March neared, until another tropical depression formed in early April. One of the three depressions became Cyclone Zena, which caused more problems to the nearly decimated Fiji. Amos formed in late April and moved over Samoa and American Samoa.

During the season, most of the island nations in the basin were impacted by systems impacting land. In particular, Raquel, Tropical Depressions 01F, 02F and 07F affected the Solomon Islands. The Samoan Islands were impacted by Tuni, Ula, Victor and Amos. Ula, Winston and Zena impacted Fiji. Individually, Ula affected Tuvalu and New Caledonia, while Winston also affected Tonga, and Vanuatu, and after leaving the basin, Niue, and eventually Queensland. Yalo affected French Polynesia in late February.

== Systems ==
=== Tropical Depression 01F ===
- Tropical depression (Australian scale)
- Tropical storm (SSHWS)
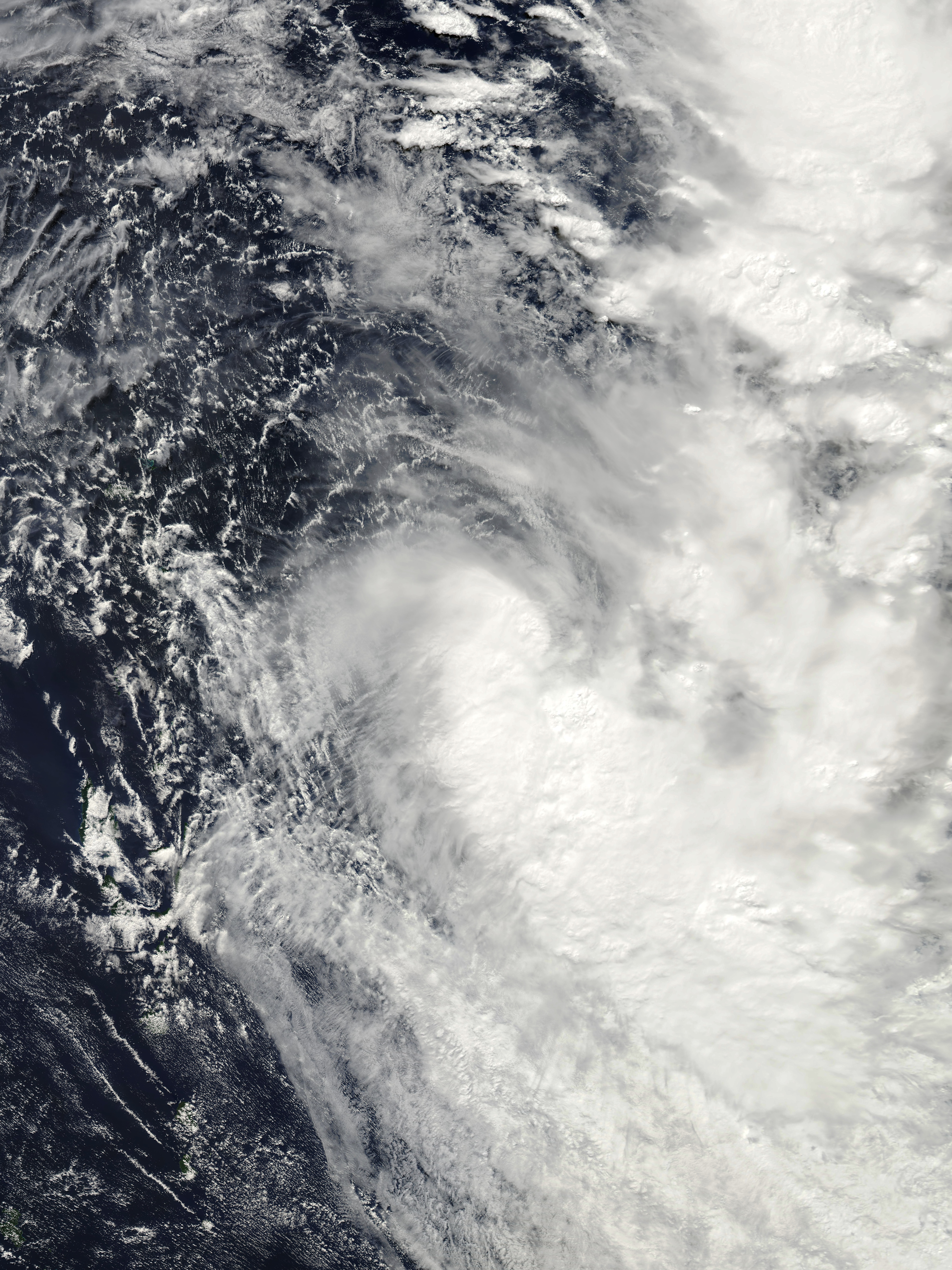
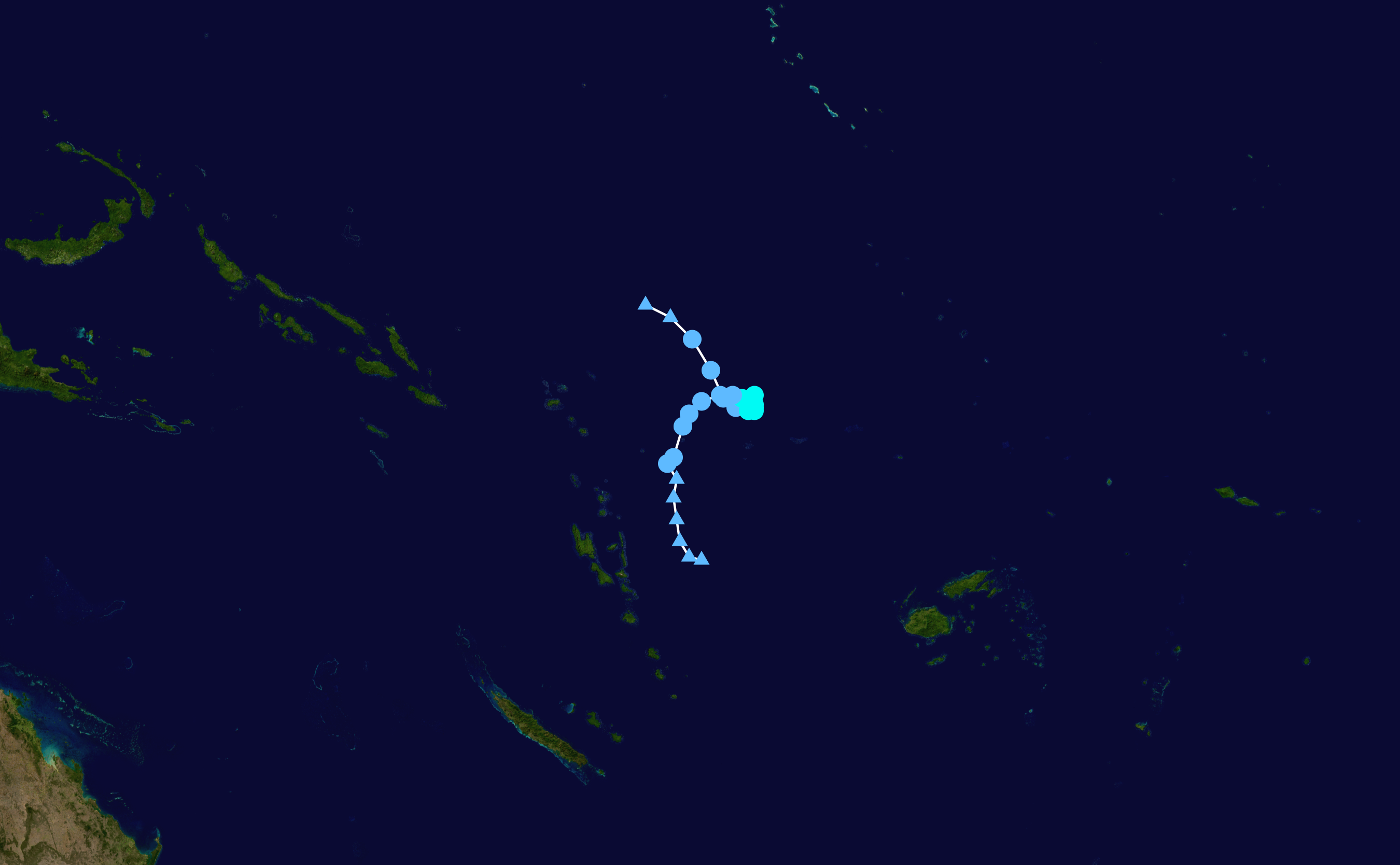
- Duration: July 29 – August 4
- Peak intensity: 75 km/h (45 mph) (1-min); 1000 hPa (mbar)

The first tropical depression of the season was first noted as a tropical disturbance during July 29, while it was located about 920 km (570 mi) to the north-northeast of Honiara in the Solomon Islands. The system lay to the north of an upper level subtropical ridge of high pressure in an area of moderate vertical wind shear. Over the next couple of days the system slowly organised further as it steered south-eastwards into an area of decreasing vertical wind shear. As a result of further organization it was classified as a tropical depression during August 1. Late on August 4, the FMS issued its final advisory on the system as it reported that the system was not expected to develop.

=== Tropical Depression 02F ===
- Tropical depression (Australian scale)
- Tropical storm (SSHWS)
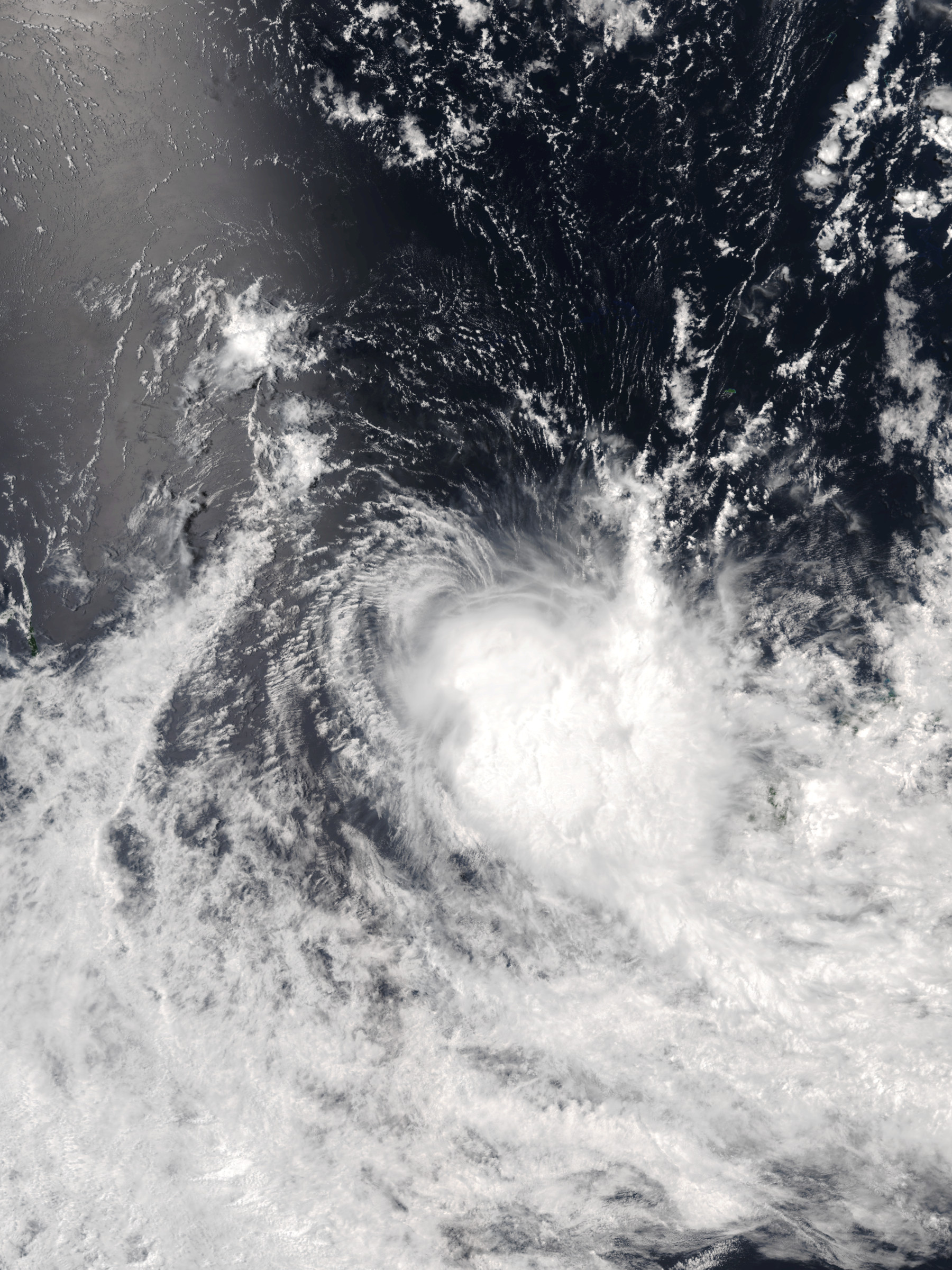
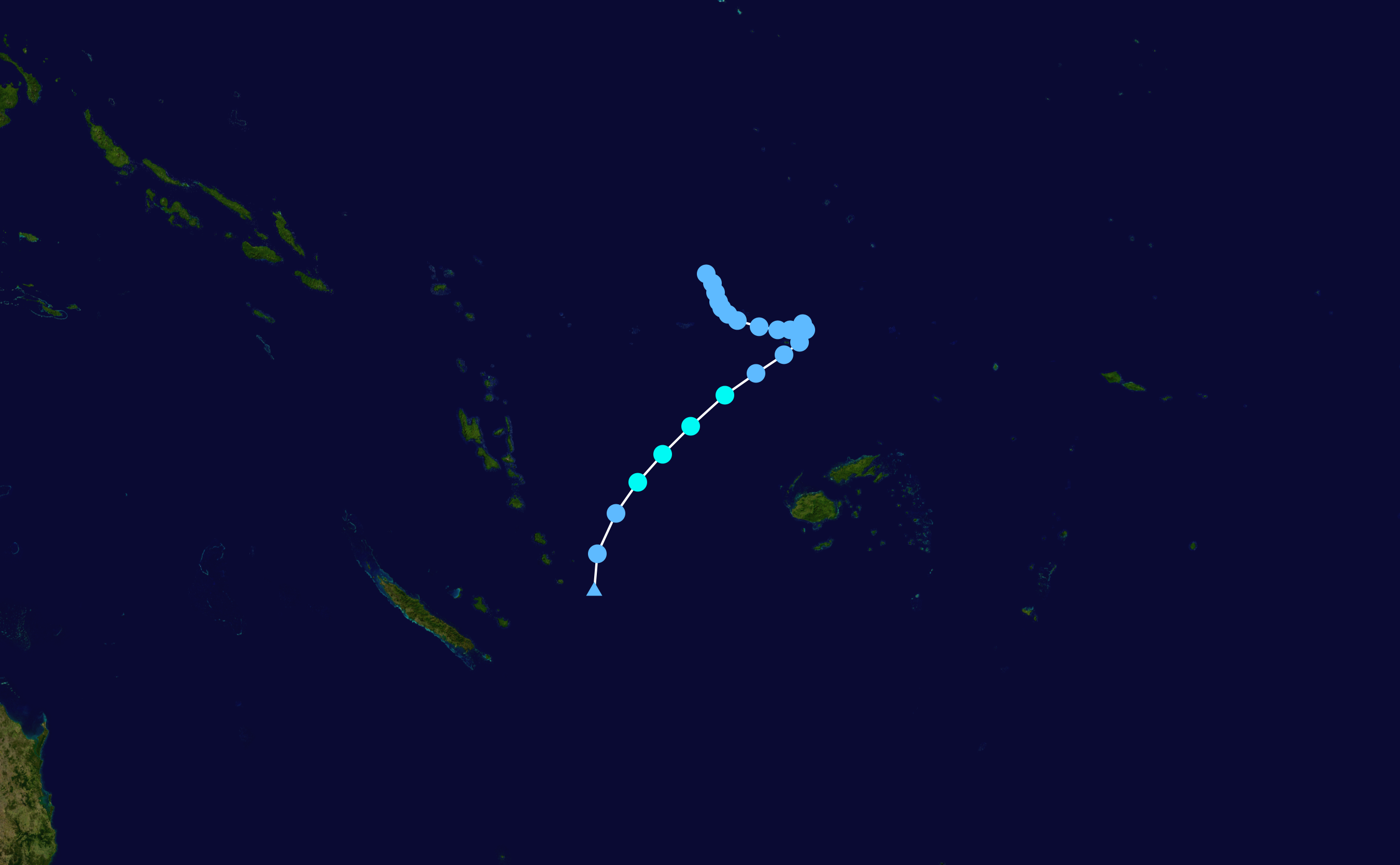
- Duration: October 12 – October 18
- Peak intensity: 45 km/h (30 mph) (10-min); 1001 hPa (mbar)

During October 12, Tropical Disturbance 02F developed along the South Pacific convergence zone, while it was located about 450 km (280 mi) to the northwest of Rotuma. The system was located within a favourable environment for further development, with low to moderate vertical wind shear, and it lay under an upper-level ridge of high pressure. Despite all of this, the system dissipated on October 18.

=== Tropical Cyclone Tuni ===
- Category 1 tropical cyclone (Australian scale)
- Tropical storm (SSHWS)
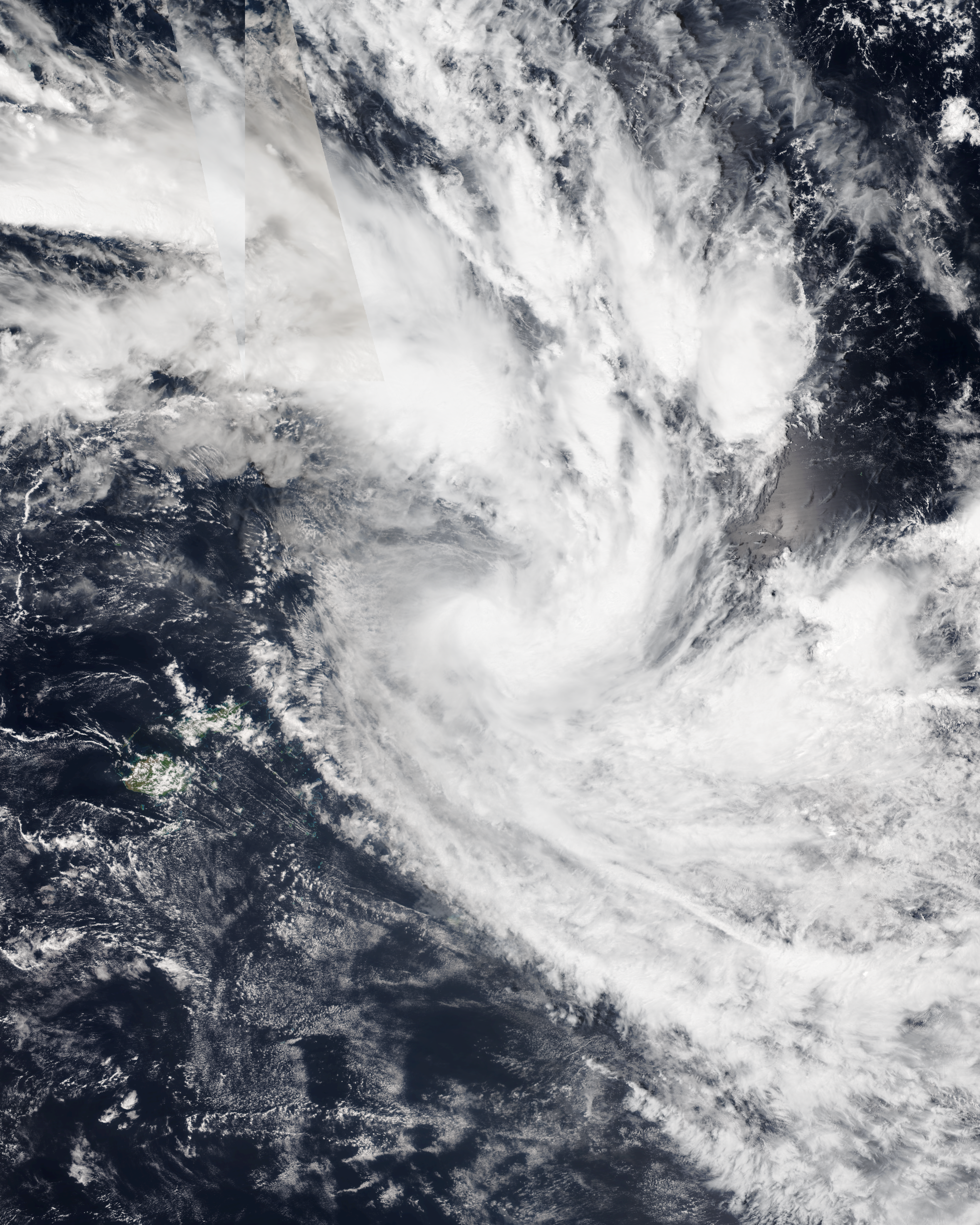
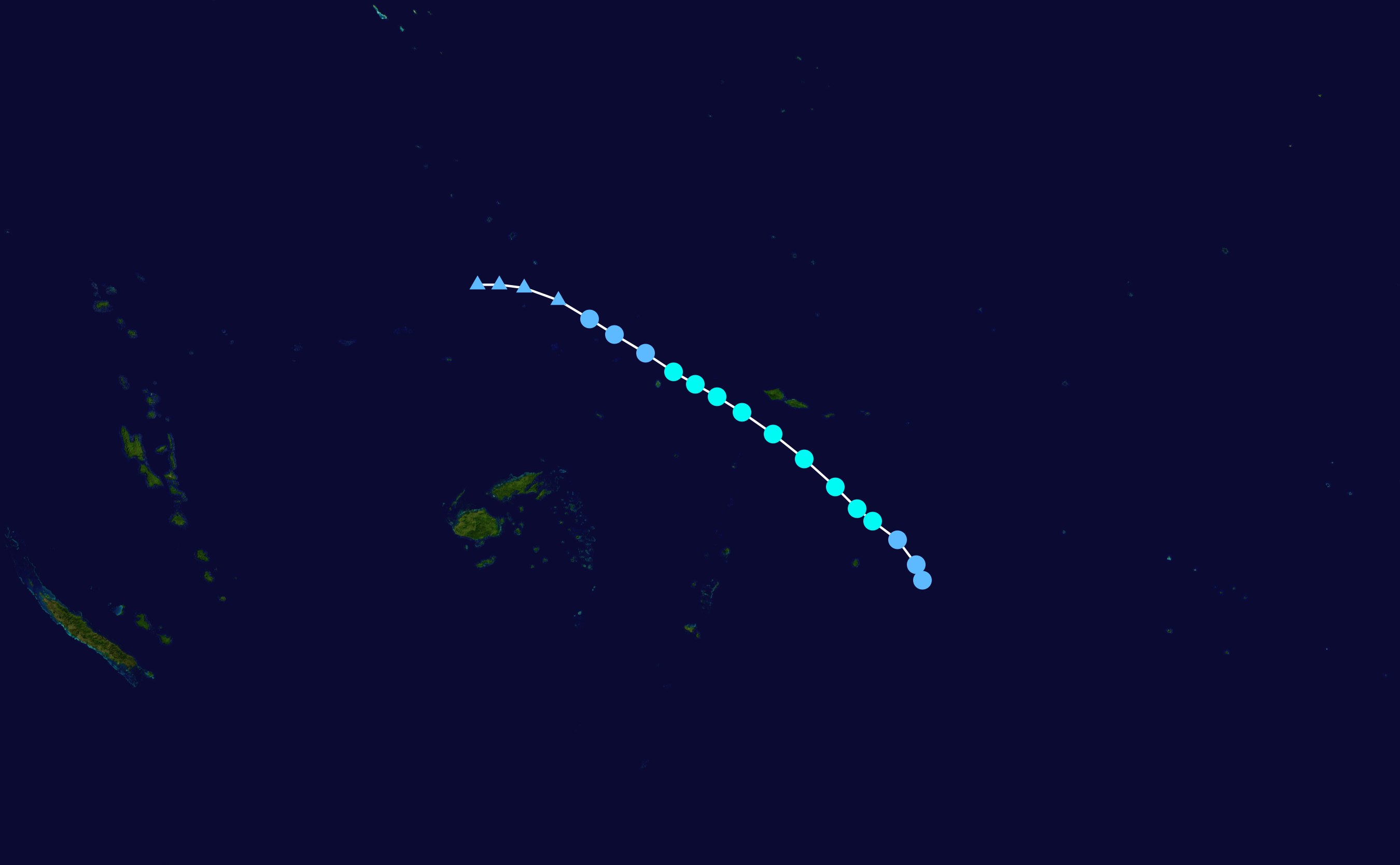
- Duration: November 23 – November 30
- Peak intensity: 75 km/h (45 mph) (10-min); 992 hPa (mbar)

On November 23, Tropical Disturbance 03F developed within a trough of low pressure, about 500 km (310 mi) to the northeast of Suva, Fiji. The system lay in an area of low to moderate vertical wind shear, to the south of an upper-level ridge of high pressure.

Across American Samoa, Tuni produced strong winds and heavy rains. Sustained winds of 90 km/h (56 mph) were observed in Tututila at an elevated location. Some trees were uprooted. Plantations, shacks, and garages sustained damage with total losses amounting to US$5 million. There was no significant damage recorded in Niue, as the system brushed the island nation.

=== Severe Tropical Cyclone Ula ===
- Category 4 severe tropical cyclone (Australian scale)
- Category 4 tropical cyclone (SSHWS)
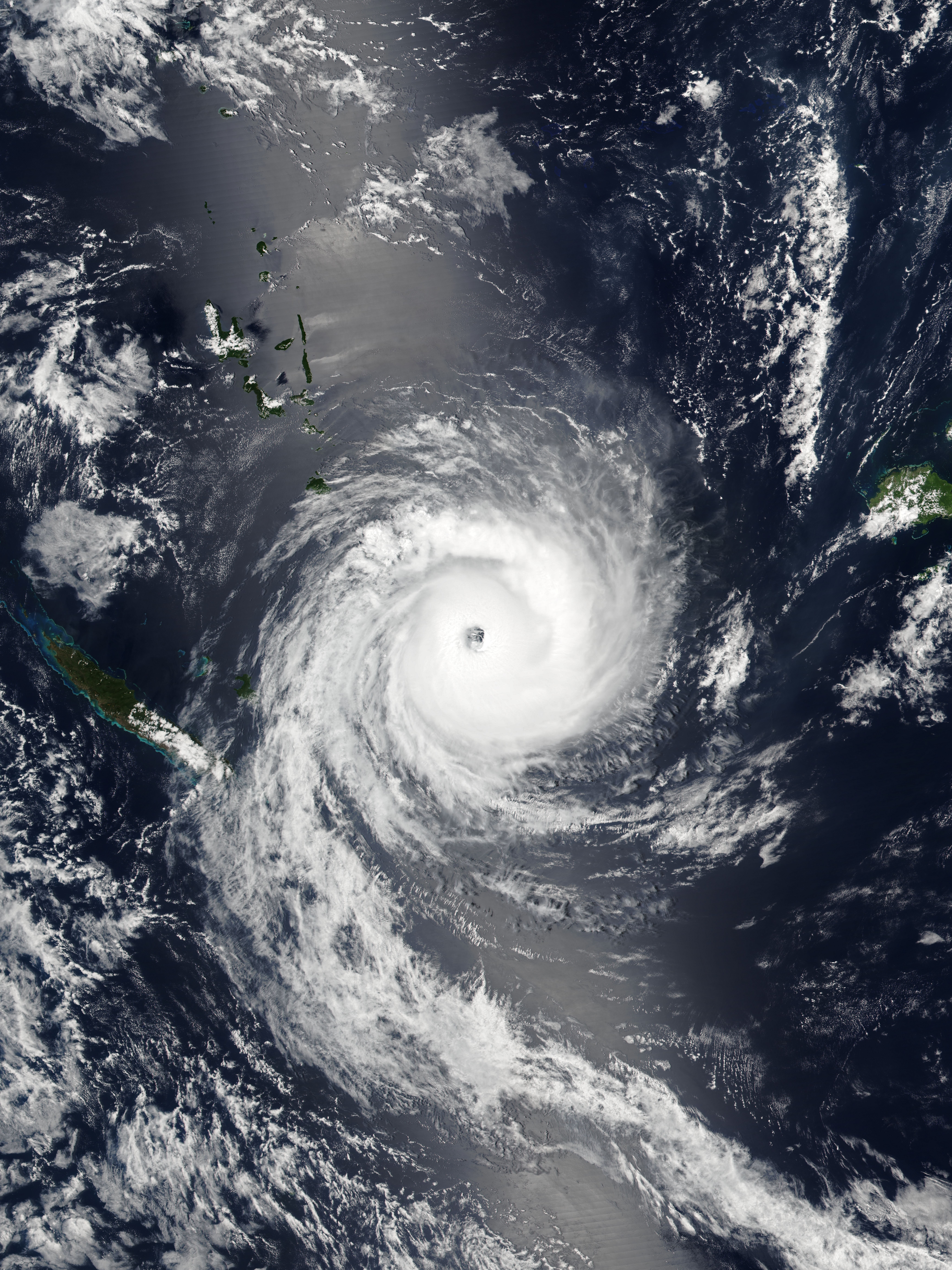
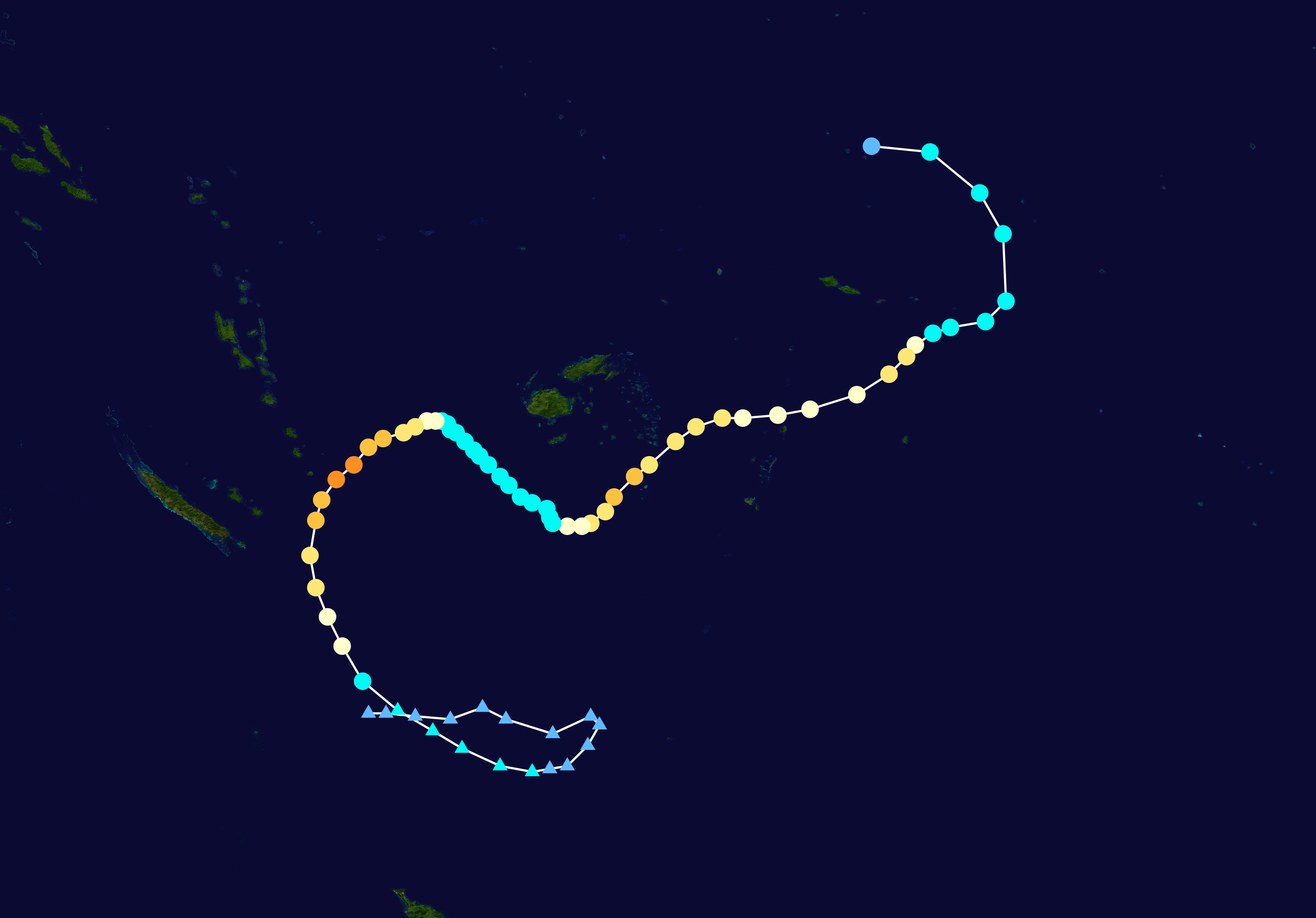
- Duration: December 26 – January 12
- Peak intensity: 185 km/h (115 mph) (10-min); 944 hPa (mbar)

In late December 2015, a long-lived and powerful westerly wind burst triggered the formation of a tropical disturbance in the south Pacific, along with its twin in the central North Pacific, which became Tropical Depression Nine-C. During December 26, Tropical Disturbance 05F developed within a monsoon trough, about 465 km (290 mi) to the south-east of the Honiara in the Solomon Islands. The system lay under an upper level ridge of high pressure in an area of moderate to high vertical wind shear. Over the next few days the system moved eastwards and gradually developed further, becoming a tropical depression during December 29, while it was located to the north of the Samoan Islands.

=== Tropical Depression 07F ===
- Tropical depression (Australian scale)
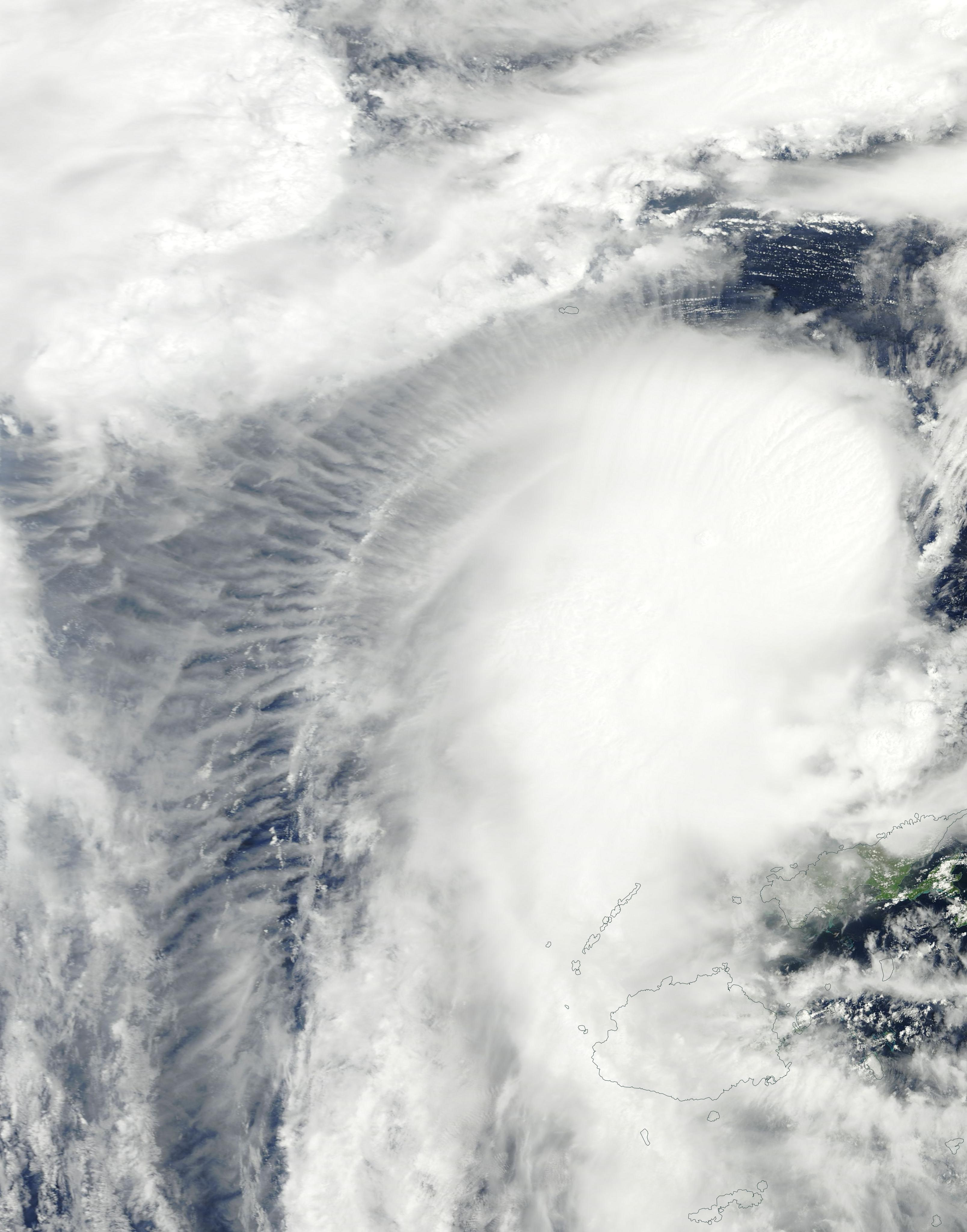
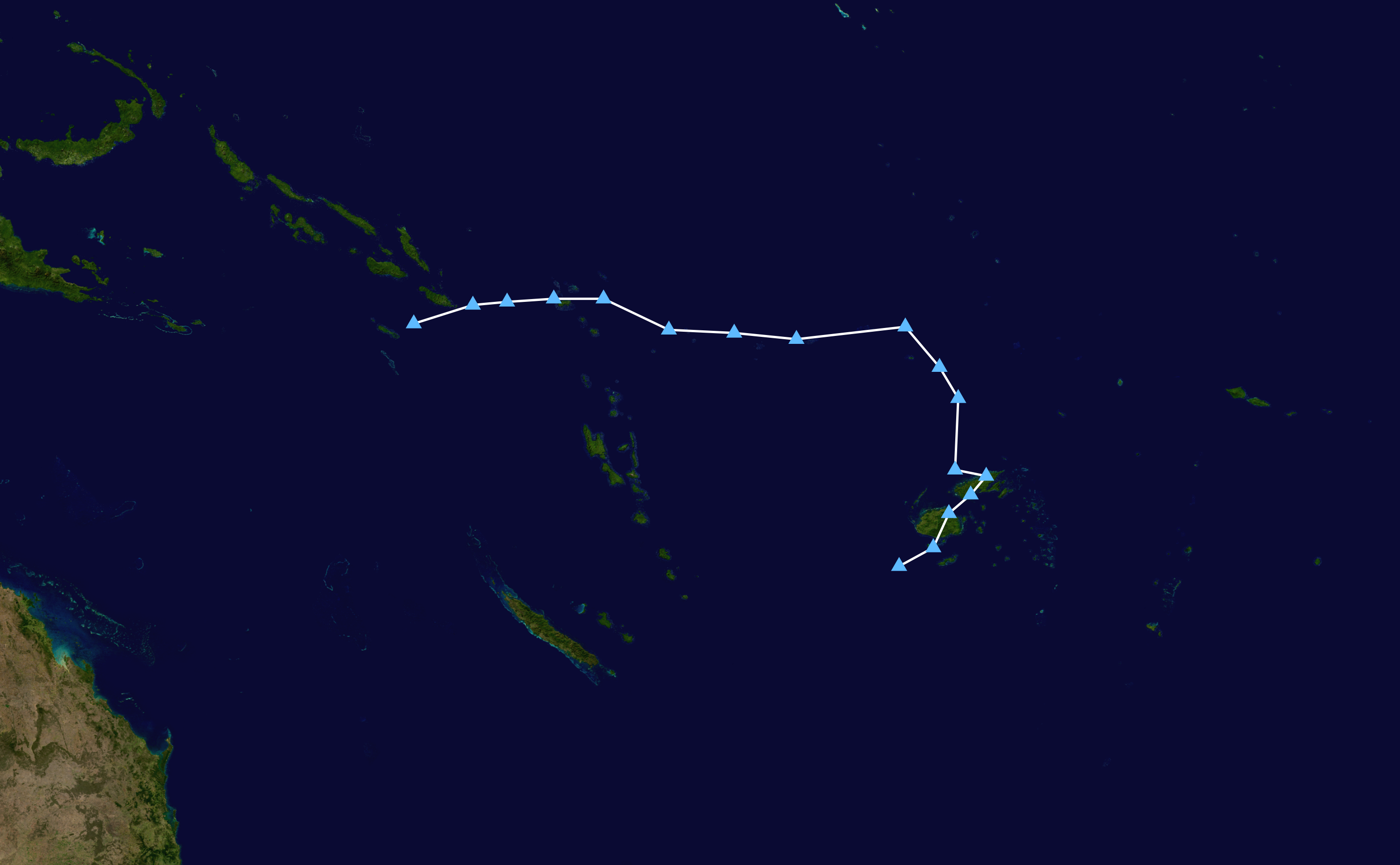
- Duration: December 28 – January 1
- Peak intensity: Winds not specified; 995 hPa (mbar)

Three people died in seagoing accidents related to Tropical Depression 07F, while four others went missing.

=== Severe Tropical Cyclone Victor ===
- Category 3 severe tropical cyclone (Australian scale)
- Category 2 tropical cyclone (SSHWS)
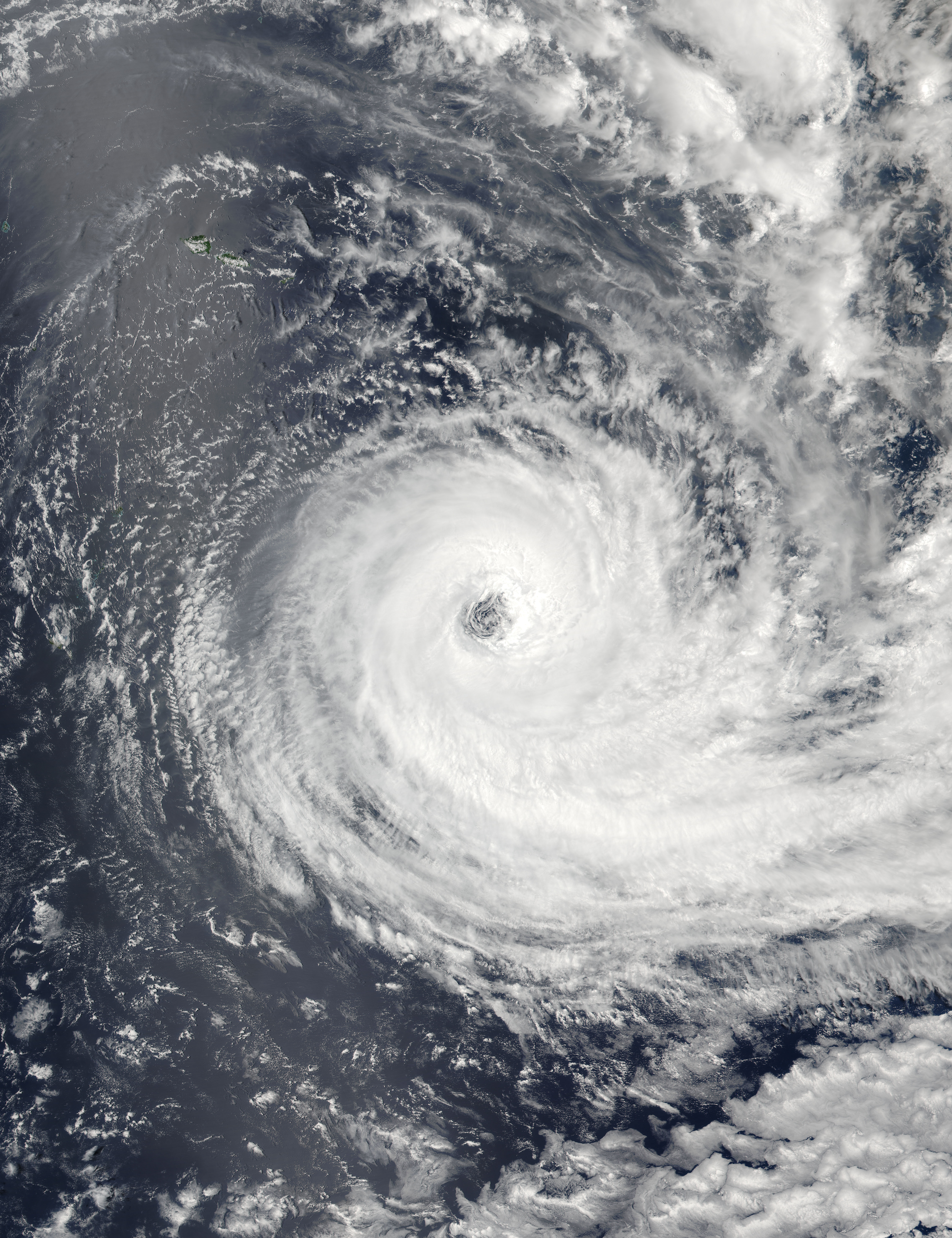
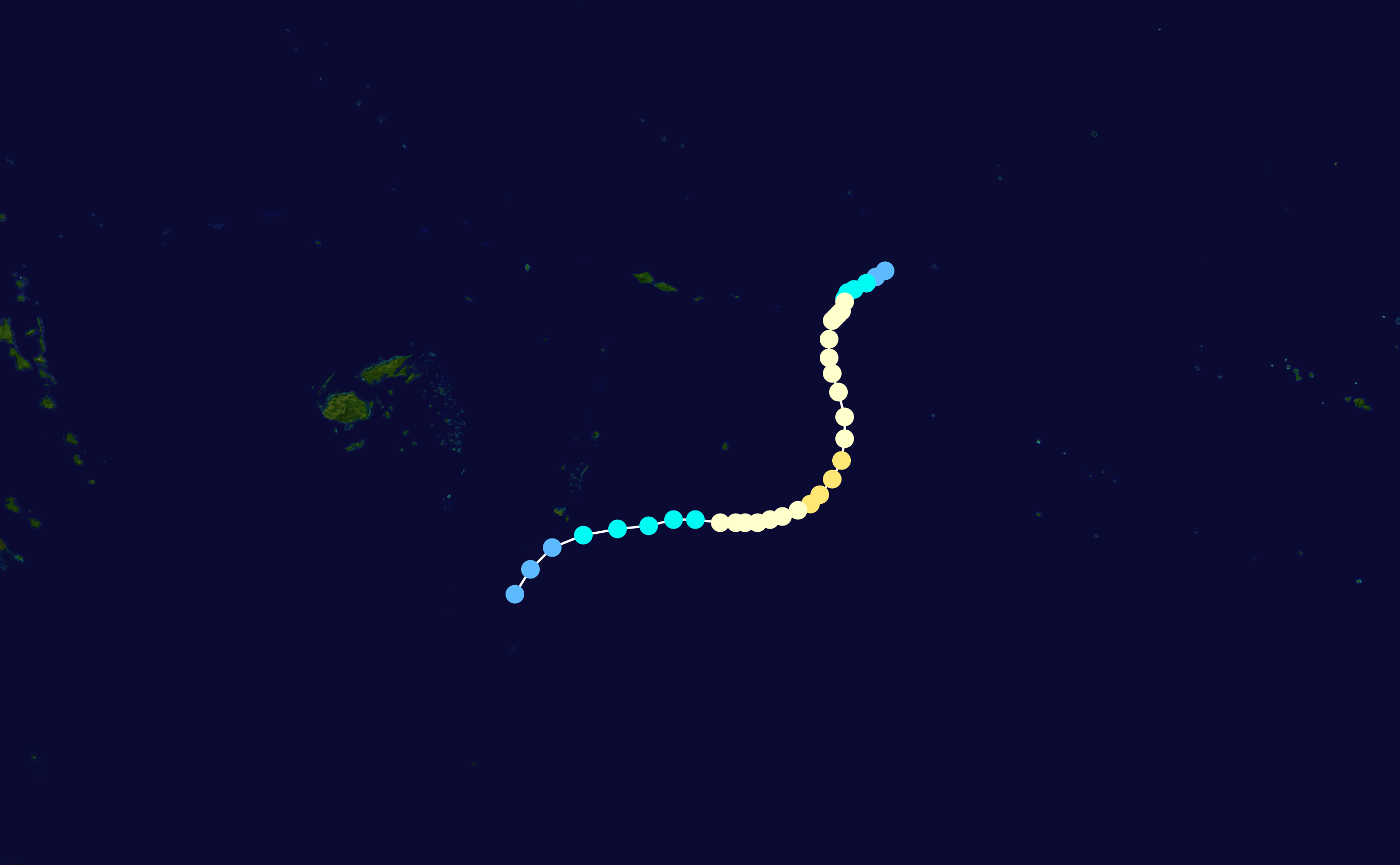
- Duration: January 14 – January 22
- Peak intensity: 150 km/h (90 mph) (10-min); 958 hPa (mbar)

On January 10, the FMS reported that Tropical Disturbance 08F had developed about 100 km (60 mi) to the northwest of Penrhyn in the Northern Cook Islands. A few days later, the system was classified as an invest, until JTWC classified it with a low-chance of developing to a tropical cyclone on January 13. Later in that same day, 08F was upgraded to a tropical depression. On January 14, the JTWC issued a TCFA alert as 08F was located in moderate wind shear and warm sea-surface temperatures, which were conductive for tropical development. Hours later, the JTWC upgraded 08F to a tropical cyclone as it was designated as 07P and started issuing advisories, located 368 mi (592 km) east of Pago Pago, American Samoa. On January 15, 08F was upgraded to a Category 1 tropical cyclone and was therefore named Victor. On January 18, Victor intensified into a Category 3 severe tropical cyclone, while the JTWC upgraded it to a Category 2 cyclone.

=== Severe Tropical Cyclone Winston ===
- Category 5 severe tropical cyclone (Australian scale)
- Category 5 tropical cyclone (SSHWS)
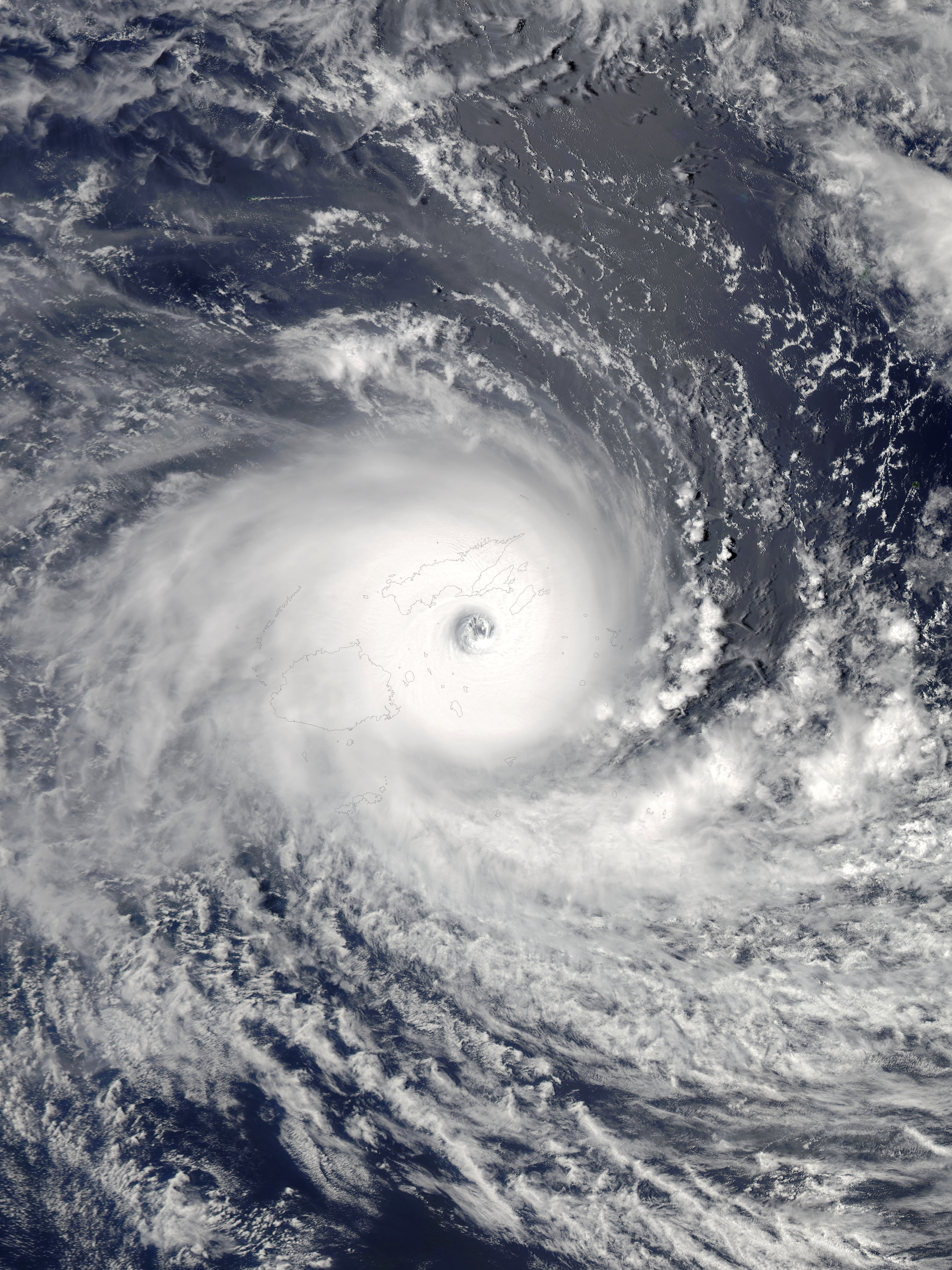
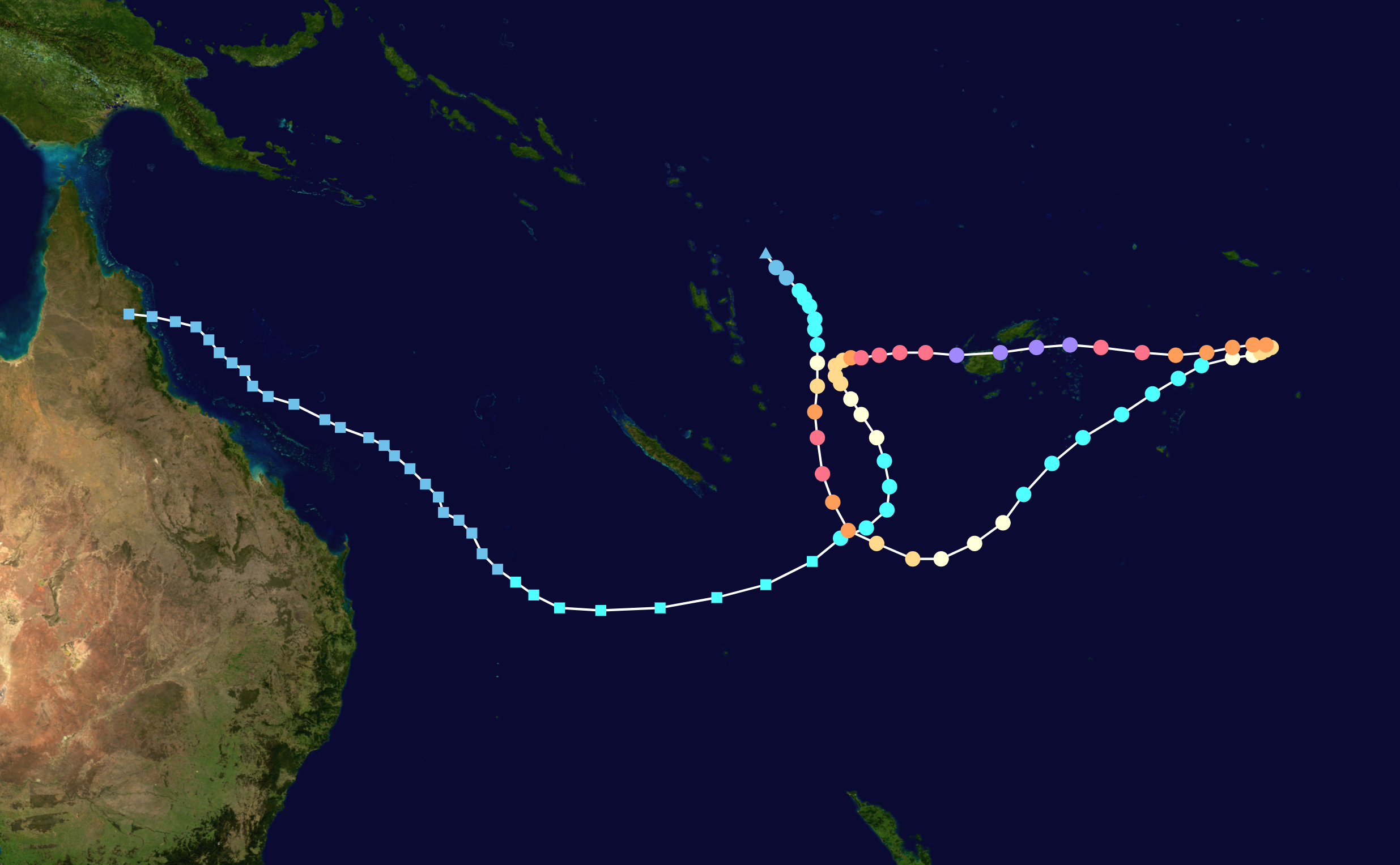
- Duration: February 7 – February 26
- Peak intensity: 280 km/h (175 mph) (10-min); 884 hPa (mbar)

Tropical Disturbance 09F developed on February 7, 2016, to the northwest of Port Vila, Vanuatu. Over the next few days, the system gradually developed as it moved southeastward, acquiring gale-force winds by February 11. The following day it underwent rapid intensification and attained ten-minute maximum sustained winds of 175 km/h (110 mph). Less favourable environmental conditions prompted weakening thereafter. After turning northeast on February 14, Winston stalled to the north of Tonga on February 17. Regaining strength, the storm doubled back to the west, achieving Category 5 status on both the Australian tropical cyclone scale and the Saffir–Simpson hurricane wind scale on February 19. It reached its record intensity the next day with ten-minute sustained winds of 280 km/h (175 mph) and a pressure of 884 hPa (mbar; 26.10 inHg), shortly before making landfall on Viti Levu, Fiji. This made it the strongest storm to ever strike the nation, as well as the strongest tropical cyclone of the Southern Hemisphere in history.

On February 26, Winston exited the South Pacific basin and entered the Australian region basin.

In advance of the storm's arrival in Fiji, numerous shelters were opened, and a nationwide curfew was instituted during the evening of February 20. Striking Fiji at Category 5 intensity on February 20, Winston inflicted extensive damage on many islands and killed at least 44 people. Communications were temporarily lost with at least six islands. Total damage from Winston amounted to $FJ 2.98 billion ($1.4 billion 2016 USD), making it the costliest cyclone on record in the basin, until it was surpassed by Cyclone Gabrielle in 2023.

=== Tropical Cyclone Tatiana ===
- Category 2 tropical cyclone (Australian scale)
- Tropical storm (SSHWS)
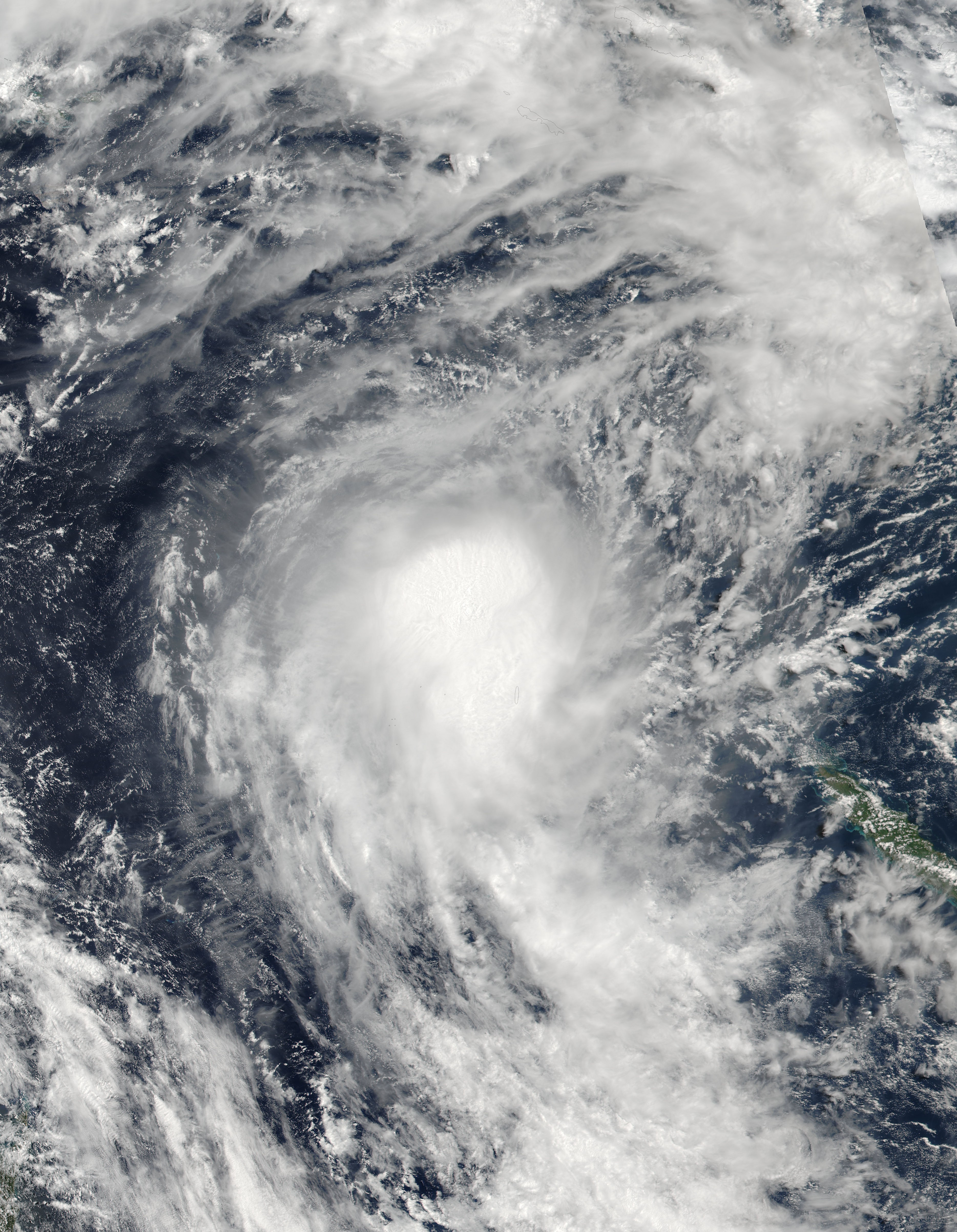
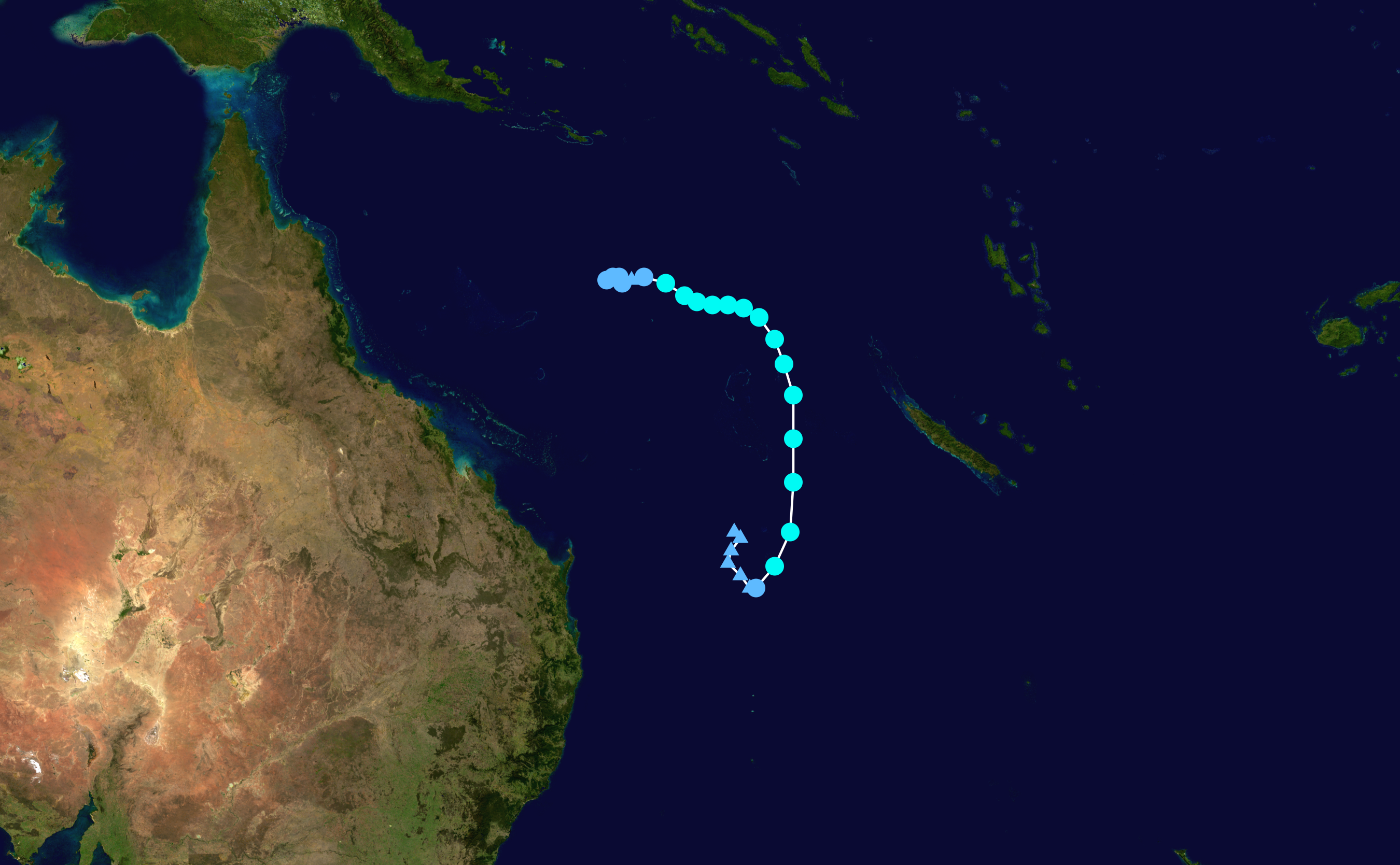
- Duration: February 12 (Entered basin) – February 13 (Exited basin)
- Peak intensity: 95 km/h (60 mph) (10-min); 983 hPa (mbar)

Tropical Cyclone Tatiana moved into the South Pacific basin from the Australian region during February 12, as it peaked as a Category 2 tropical cyclone with 10-minute sustained winds of 95 km/h (60 mph). The system subsequently moved southwards and rapidly weakened during the next day, crossing back into BoM's area of responsibility. On the next day it degenerated into a remnant low.

=== Tropical Cyclone Yalo ===
- Category 1 tropical cyclone (Australian scale)
- Tropical storm (SSHWS)
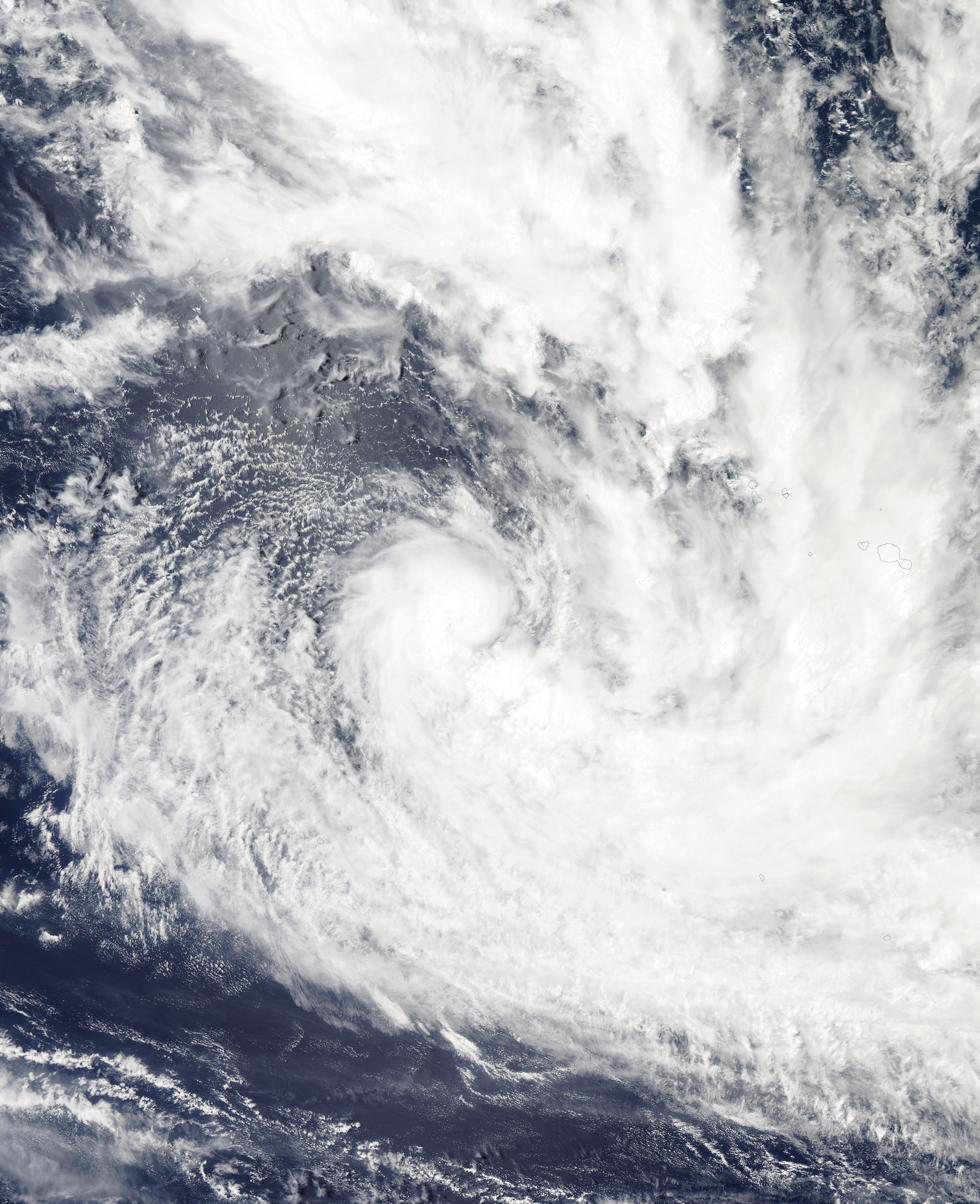
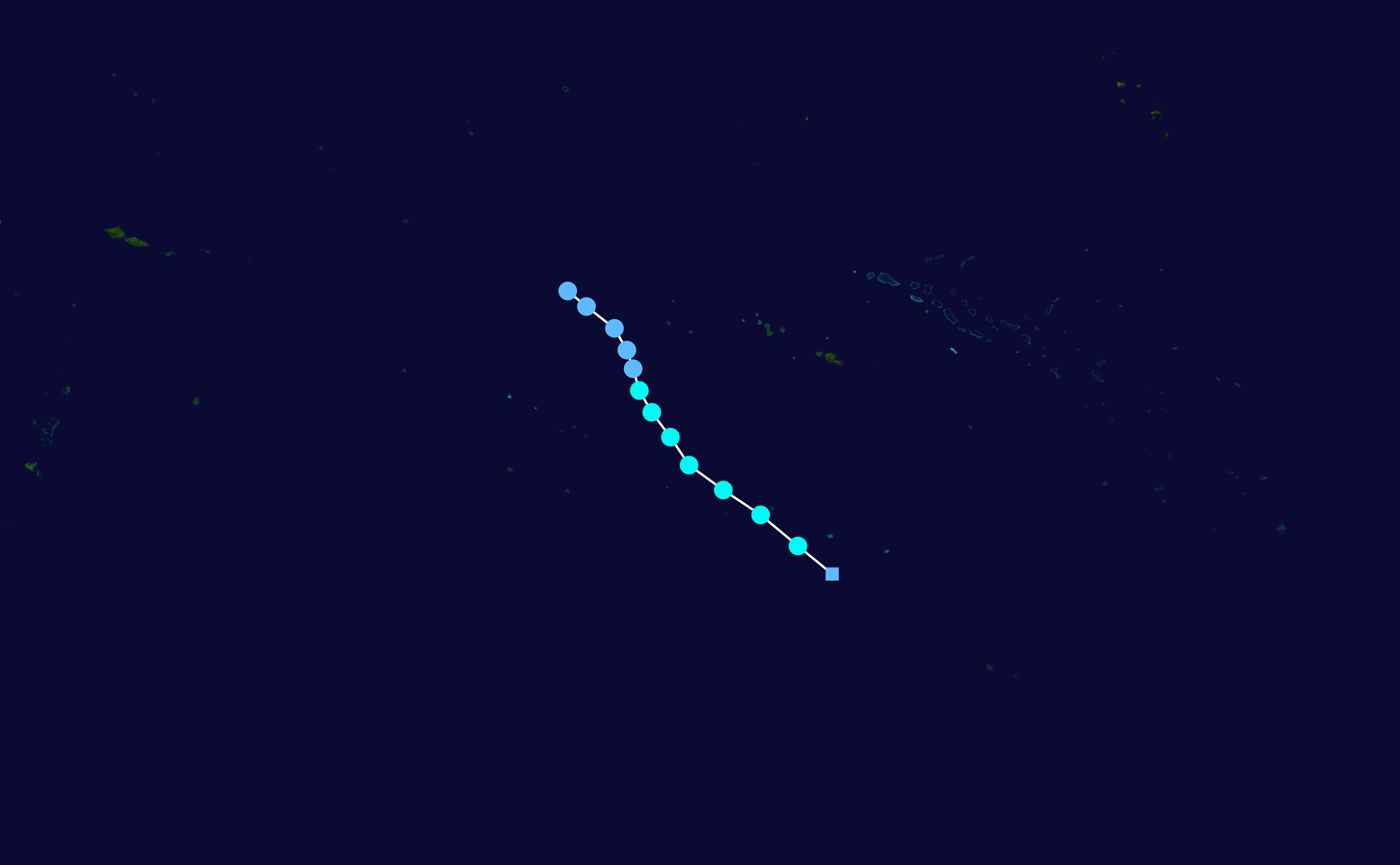
- Duration: February 24 – February 26
- Peak intensity: 75 km/h (45 mph) (10-min); 993 hPa (mbar)

During February 23, Tropical Disturbance 11F developed underneath an upper-level ridge of high pressure, about 850 km (530 mi) to the northwest of Tahiti, French Polynesia. By the next day, the JTWC issued a Tropical Cyclone Formation Alert as it was located over in favorable conditions of developing further. The JTWC later upgraded 11F to a tropical storm, giving the system the identifier of 14P, early on February 25.

=== Severe Tropical Cyclone Zena ===
- Category 3 severe tropical cyclone (Australian scale)
- Category 2 tropical cyclone (SSHWS)
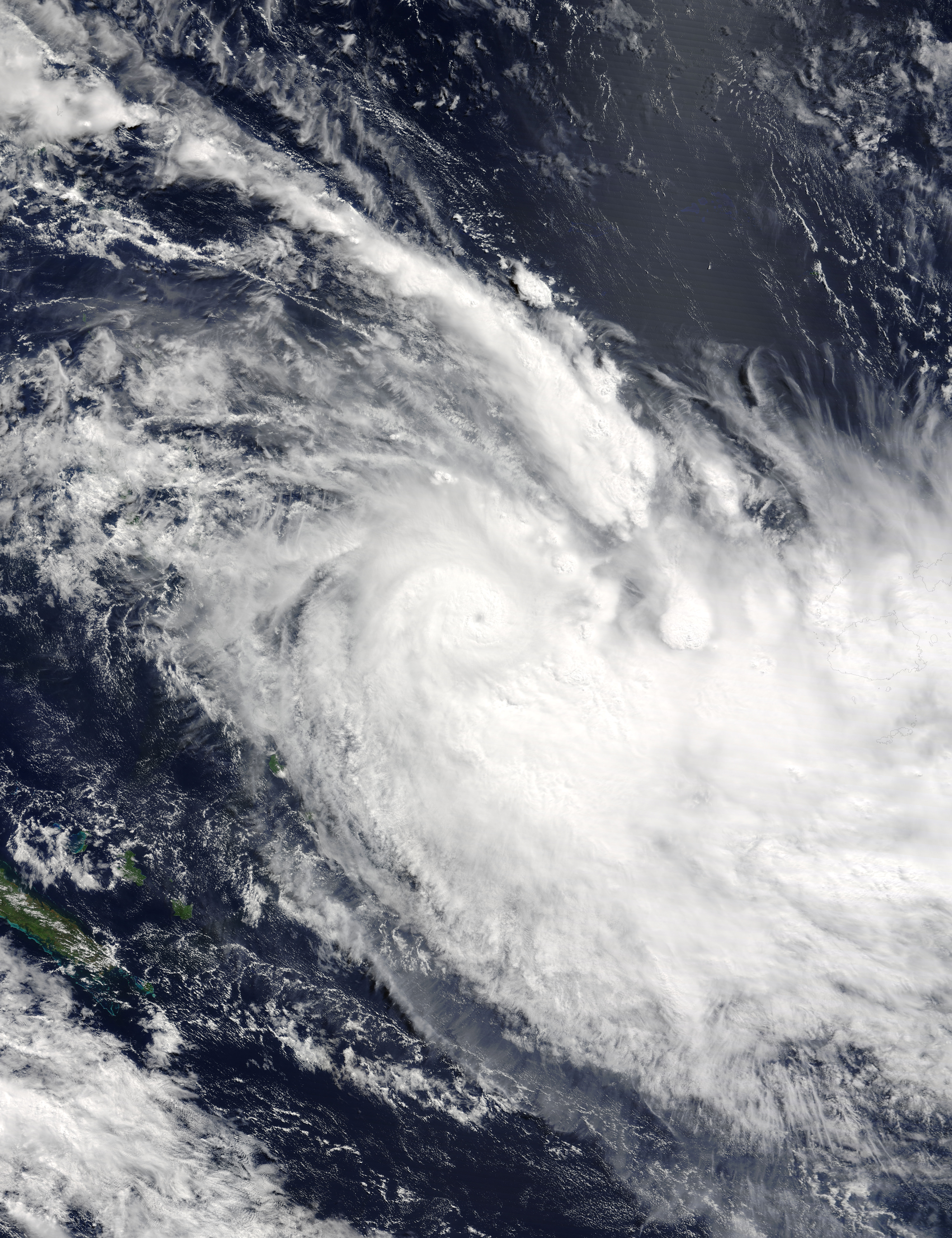
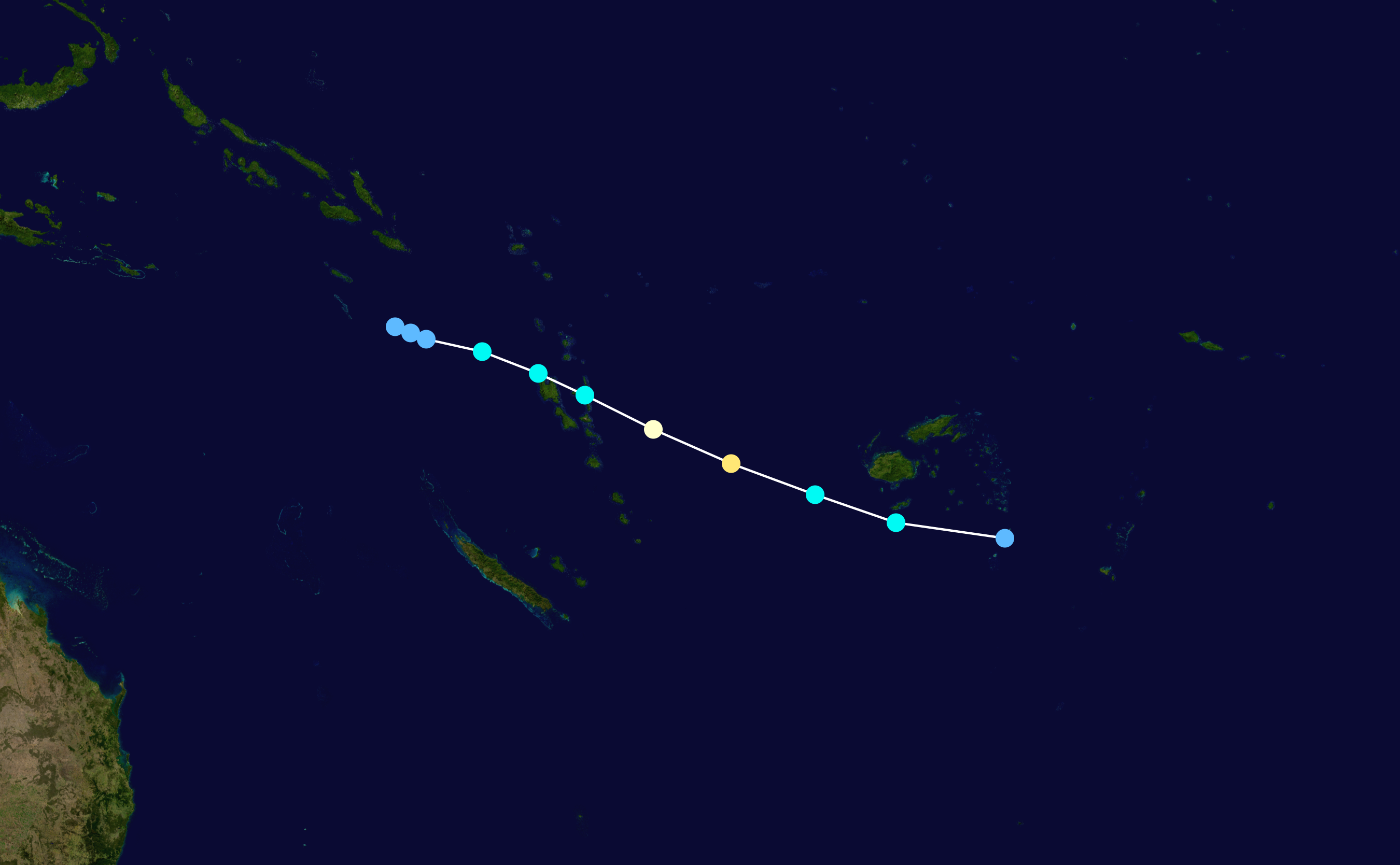
- Duration: April 5 – April 7
- Peak intensity: 130 km/h (80 mph) (10-min); 975 hPa (mbar)

Cyclone Zena developed in early April 2016 and reached Category 3 severe tropical cyclone intensity, with ten-minute sustained winds of 130 km/h (80 mph). The storm affected the Solomon Islands, Vanuatu, Fiji, and Tonga, and was associated with three deaths.

=== Severe Tropical Cyclone Amos ===
- Category 3 severe tropical cyclone (Australian scale)
- Category 2 tropical cyclone (SSHWS)
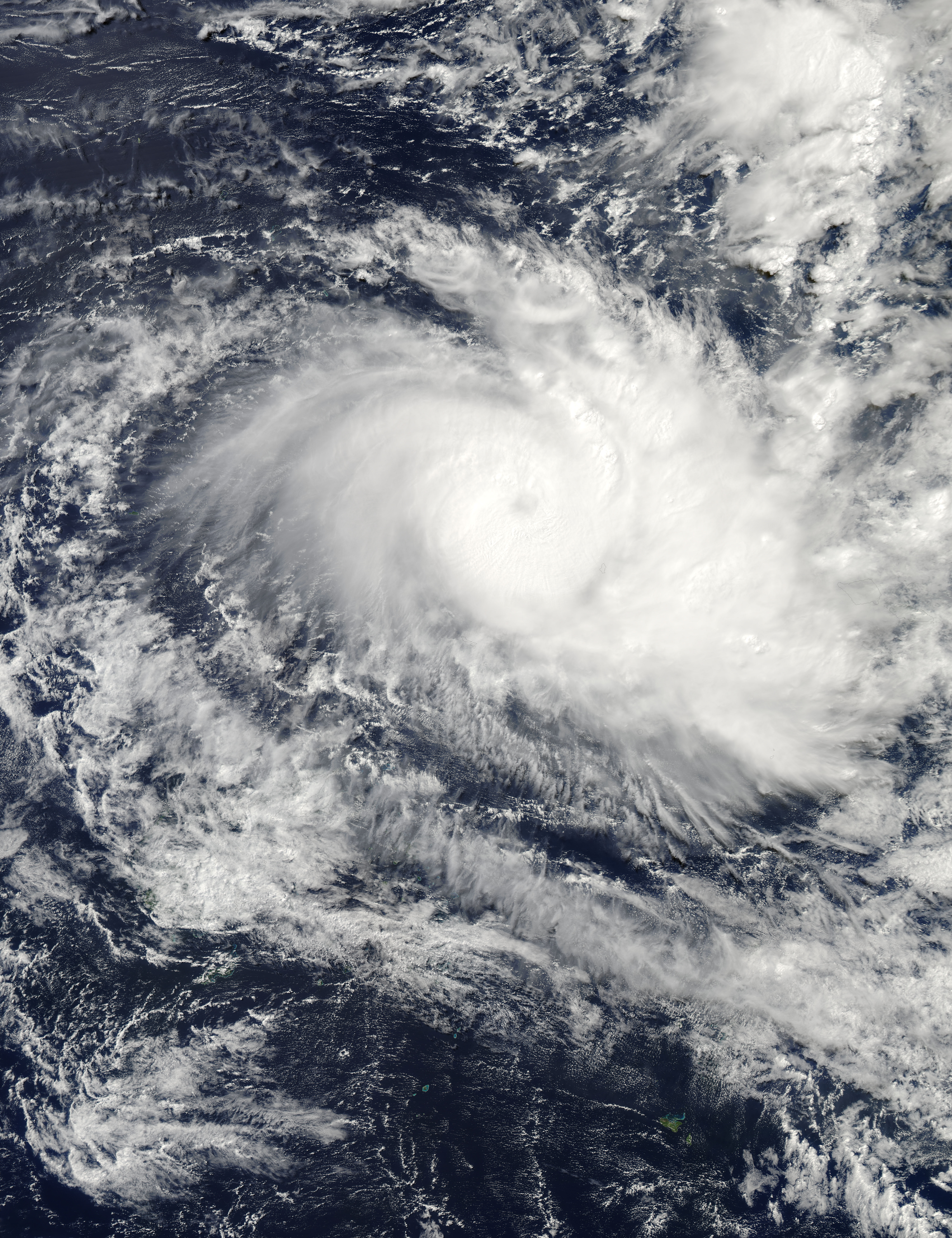
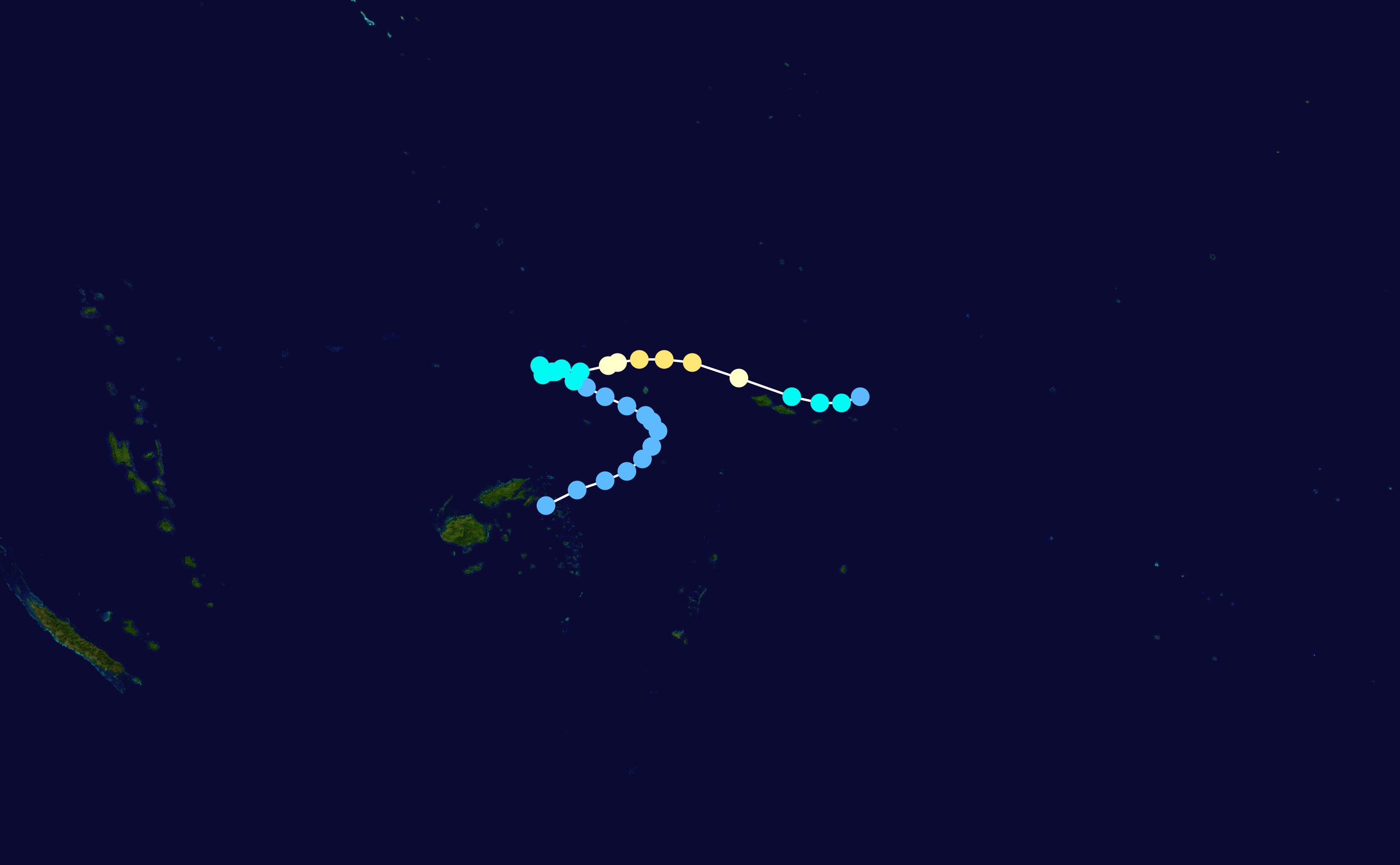
- Duration: April 20 – April 24
- Peak intensity: 150 km/h (90 mph) (10-min); 965 hPa (mbar)

Tropical Disturbance 17F was first noted on April 13, while it was located about 130 km (80 mi) to the northwest of the Fijian dependency of Rotuma. The system subsequently moved south-eastwards towards the Fijian Islands, before it passed near or over Vanua Levu during April 16. After passing over Fiji, the system gradually developed further as it moved north-eastwards towards the Samoan Islands. The system was subsequently named Amos during April 20, after it had developed into a tropical cyclone and started to move north-westwards towards the island nation of Tuvalu.

=== Other systems ===
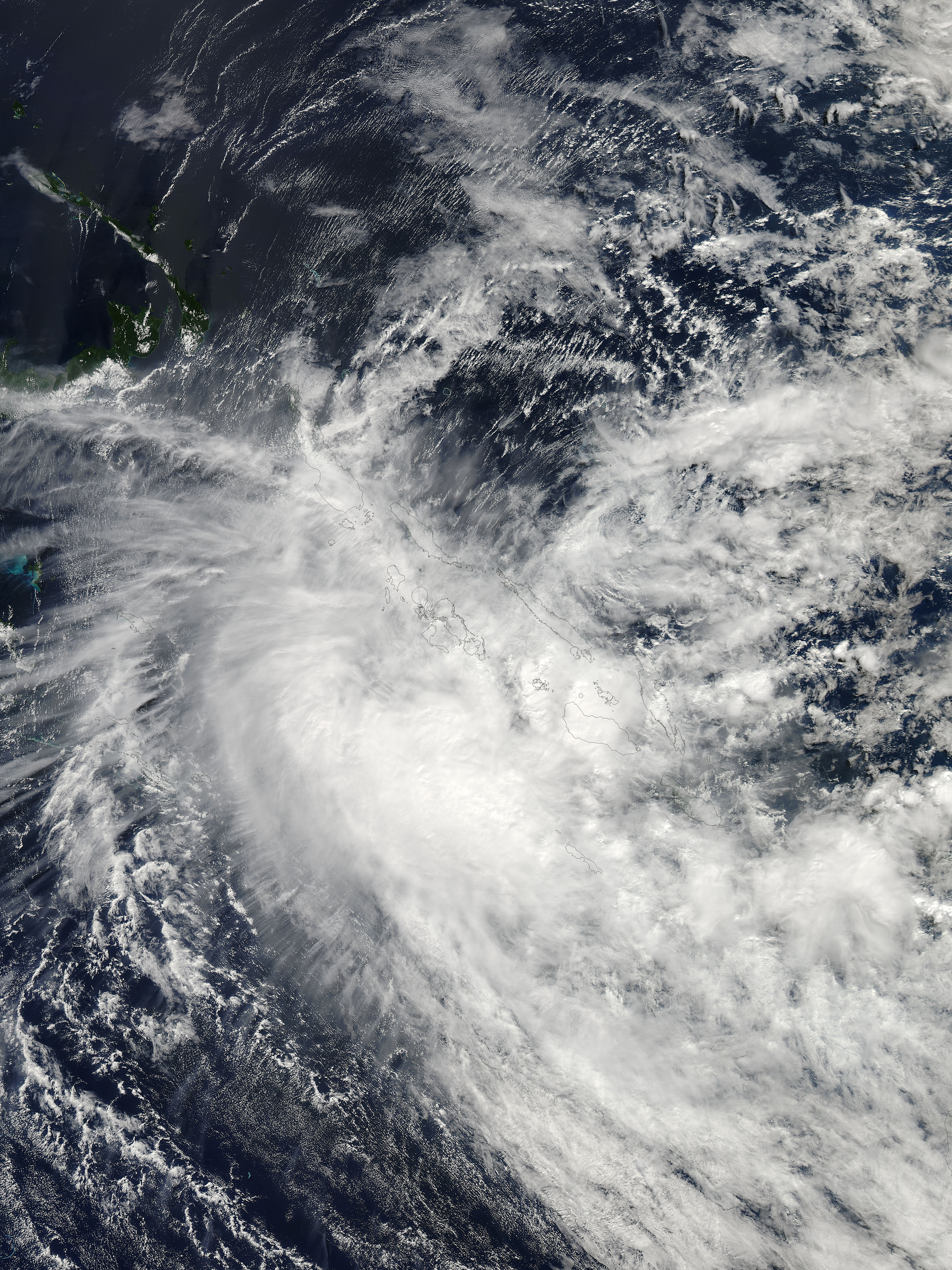
Cyclone Raquel entering the basin on July 2, 2015

As the 2015–16 tropical cyclone year opened on July 1, Tropical Cyclone Raquel was located in the Australian region to the north-west of Honiara. Over the next 24 hours, the system recurved eastwards and weakened into a tropical depression, as it entered the basin on July 2. The system subsequently moved westwards and out of the basin during July 4, as it impacted the Solomon Islands, with high wind gusts and heavy rain. Tropical Disturbance 04F was first noted on December 1, while it was located about 640 km (400 mi) to the northeast of Papeete in French Polynesia. Over the next day the poorly organised system moved westwards, underneath an upper-level ridge of high pressure before it dissipated during December 2. During December 27, Tropical Disturbance 06F developed to the north of Wallis Island, in an area of moderate to high vertical wind shear.

During February 29, Tropical Disturbance 12F developed about 330 km (205 mi), to the northwest of Papeete on the island of Tahiti in French Polynesia. However, during that day as the system moved southwards in an area of low vertical wind shear, atmospheric convection decreased in magnitude before it was last noted during March 1. Tropical Disturbance 13F was first noted on March 19, about 500 km (310 mi) to the northwest of Nouméa in New Caledonia. Over the next couple of days the system moved east-southeast, before it was last noted during March 21, to the southeast of New Caledonia.

On April 2, Tropical Disturbance 14F formed from an active monsoon trough over Vanuatu. The system moved in a slow eastward motion over in an area of favorable environments, thus, RSMC Nadi forecast the system to reach tropical cyclone intensity. During April 5, 14F began to weaken with a lack of further organisation and therefore, RSMC Nadi issued its final bulletin later that day. In the same time when 14F was formed, RSMC Nadi had reported of the formation of Tropical Disturbance 15F just to the east of Fiji. Again, 15F was located over in favorable environments with deep convection and a developing LLCC. During April 4, the JTWC issued a TCFA on the system, however it was also mentioned that organization started to weaken. 15F passed Fiji and rapidly diminished on April 6. During April 20, Tropical Disturbance 18F developed within an area of low to moderate vertical wind-shear, to the south of an upper-level ridge of high pressure to the north of the Southern Cook Islands.

== Storm names ==
Within the Southern Pacific a tropical depression is judged to have reached tropical cyclone intensity should it reach winds of 65 km/h (40 mph) and it is evident that gales are occurring at least halfway around the center. Tropical depressions that intensify into a tropical cyclone between the Equator and 25°S and between 160°E and 120°W are named by the FMS. However, should a tropical depression intensify to the south of 25°S between 160°E and 120°W it will be named by MetService in conjunction with the FMS. If a tropical cyclone moves out of the basin and into the Australian region, it will retain its original name. The names Tuni, Ula, Victor, Winston, Yalo, Zena and Amos would be used for the first (and only, in the case of Ula, Winston, Yalo and Zena) time this year, after replacing the names Tui, Ursula, Veli, Wes, Yali, Zuman and Alan after the 1997-98 season. The names that were used for the 2015-16 season are listed below:

- Tuni
- Ula
- Victor
- Winston
- Yalo
- Zena
- Amos

If a tropical cyclone enters the South Pacific basin from the Australian region basin (west of 160°E), it will retain the name assigned to it by the Australian Bureau of Meteorology. The following storms were named in this manner:

- Tatiana

=== Retirement ===
After the season, the names Ula and Winston were both retired, and replaced with Ulu and Wanita respectively. Yalo and Zena were replaced with Yates and Zidane for unknown reasons.

== Season effects ==
This table lists all the storms that developed in the South Pacific to the east of longitude 160°E during the 2015–16 season. It includes their intensity on the Australian tropical cyclone intensity scale, duration, name, landfalls, deaths, and damages. All data is taken from RSMC Nadi and/or TCWC Wellington, and all of the damage figures are in 2015 USD.

Name	Dates	Peak intensity			Areas affected	Damage (USD)	Deaths	Ref(s).
Name	Dates	Category	Wind speed	Pressure	Areas affected	Damage (USD)	Deaths	Ref(s).
01F	July 29 – August 4	Tropical depression	Not specified	1,000 hPa (29.53 inHg)	Solomon Islands, Vanuatu	None	None	
02F	October 12–18	Tropical depression	45 km/h (30 mph)	1,001 hPa (29.56 inHg)	Vanuatu	None	None	
Tuni	November 26–30	Category 1 tropical cyclone	75 km/h (45 mph)	992 hPa (29.29 inHg)	Tuvalu, Samoan Islands, Niue, Tonga	$5 million	None	
04F	December 1–2	Tropical disturbance	Not specified	1,003 hPa (29.62 inHg)	French Polynesia	None	None	
Ula	December 26 – January 12	Category 4 severe tropical cyclone	185 km/h (115 mph)	944 hPa (27.88 inHg)	Tuvalu, Samoan Islands, Tonga, Fiji, Vanuatu, New Caledonia	Minimal	1	
06F	December 27–30	Tropical disturbance	Not specified	997 hPa (29.44 inHg)	Wallis and Futuna	None	None	
07F	December 28 – January 1	Tropical depression	Not specified	995 hPa (29.38 inHg)	Solomon Islands, Tuvalu, Fiji	None	3	
Victor	January 14–22	Category 3 severe tropical cyclone	150 km/h (95 mph)	958 hPa (28.29 inHg)	Northern Cook Islands, Niue, Tonga	None	None	
Winston	February 7–26	Category 5 severe tropical cyclone	280 km/h (175 mph)	884 hPa (26.10 inHg)	Vanuatu, Fiji, Tonga, Niue	$1.4 billion	44	
Tatiana	February 12–13	Category 2 tropical cyclone	95 km/h (60 mph)	983 hPa (29.03 inHg)	None	None	None	
Yalo	February 24–26	Category 1 tropical cyclone	75 km/h (45 mph)	993 hPa (29.32 inHg)	Cook Islands, French Polynesia	None	None	
12F	February 29 – March 1	Tropical disturbance	Not specified	1,000 hPa (29.53 inHg)	French Polynesia	None	None	
13F	March 19–22	Tropical disturbance	Not specified	998 hPa (29.47 inHg)	New Caledonia, Vanuatu	None	None	
14F	April 1–5	Tropical disturbance	Not specified	1,002 hPa (29.59 inHg)	Vanuatu	None	None	
15F	April 2–6	Tropical disturbance	Not specified	998 hPa (29.47 inHg)	Fiji	Minor	None	
Zena	April 5–7	Category 3 severe tropical cyclone	130 km/h (80 mph)	975 hPa (28.79 inHg)	Solomon Islands, Vanuatu, Fiji, Tonga	Minimal	2	
Amos	April 20–24	Category 3 severe tropical cyclone	150 km/h (95 mph)	965 hPa (28.50 inHg)	Fiji, Wallis and Futuna, Samoan Islands	Minimal	None	
18F	April 20–27	Tropical disturbance	Not specified	1,002 hPa (29.59 inHg)	French Polynesia	None	None	
Season aggregates
18 systems	July 29 – April 27		280 km/h (175 mph)	884 hPa (26.10 inHg)		$1.405 billion	50	

== See also ==
- Weather of 2015 and 2016
- Tropical cyclones in 2015 and 2016
- List of South Pacific cyclone seasons
- Atlantic hurricane seasons: 2015, 2016
- Pacific hurricane seasons: 2015, 2016
- Pacific typhoon seasons: 2015, 2016
- North Indian Ocean cyclone seasons: 2015, 2016
- 2015–16 South-West Indian Ocean cyclone season
- 2015–16 Australian region cyclone season
