= Yellow Creek (South Dakota) =

Stream in South Dakota, U.S.

Coordinates: 44°20′26″N 103°45′15″W

Yellow Creek is a stream in the U.S. state of South Dakota. It is a tributary of Whitewood Creek with the confluence south of Lead, South Dakota.

It was named for the yellow color of its water, which comes from limestone and sandstone deposits.

== See also ==
- List of rivers of South Dakota
