= Yellow Creek (Michigan) =

Stream in Berrien County, Michigan, U.S.

Coordinates: 42°07′35″N 86°22′16″W

Yellow Creek is a stream in Berrien County, in the U.S. state of Michigan. It is a tributary to Blue Creek.

Yellow Creek was so named on account of the yellowish hue of the water.
