= Nicholas Tse discography =

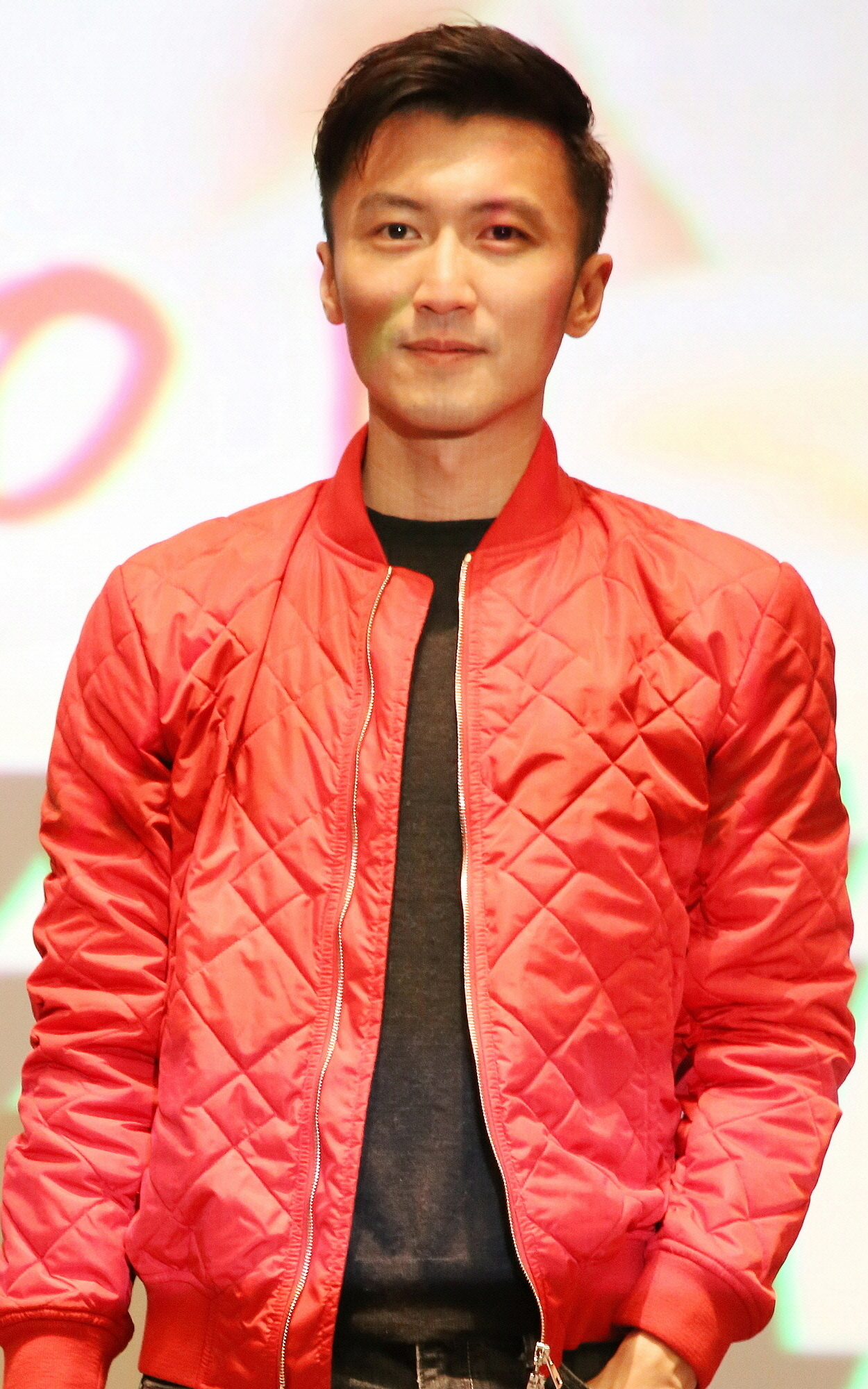
- Tse in 2017
- Studio albums: 16
- Extended plays: 2
- Live albums: 5
- Compilation albums: 5

Hong Kong recording artist Nicholas Tse has released over 30 records in his career since his debut in 1997. Some of his records, including Me (2002) and Release (2005), have been issued in second editions. His 2001 albums sold over 1 million copies in East and Southeast Asia.

== Studio albums ==
=== Cantonese studio albums ===
| Title | Album details | Certifications |
|---|---|---|
| My Attitude | Released: May 16, 1997; Label: Fitto Records; Formats: CD, CD+VCD, cassette | IFPIHK: Platinum |
| Horizons | Released: July 18, 1998; Label: Fitto Records; Formats: CD, CD+VCD, cassette | |
| Believe | Released: April 28, 1999; Label: Fitto Records, EEG; Formats: CD, CD+VCD, cassette | |
| Zero Distance (零距離) | Released: May 9, 2000; Label: EEG; Formats: CD, CD+VCD, cassette | |
| Viva | Released: November 7, 2000; Label: EEG; Formats: CD, CD+VCD, cassette | |
| Jade Butterfly (玉蝴蝶) | Released: May 22, 2001; Label: EEG; Formats: CD, CD+VCD, cassette | |
| Me | Released: January 23, 2002; Label: EEG; Formats: CD, CD+VCD, digital download | |
| Reborn | Released: June 13, 2003; Label: EEG; Formats: CD, CD+VCD, digital download | |
| One Inch Closer | Released: July 5, 2005; Label: EEG; Formats: CD, CD+VCD, digital download | |

=== Mandarin studio albums ===
| Album name | Album details | Sales |
|---|---|---|
| Grateful for Your Love '99 (謝謝你的愛) | Released: September 22, 1999; Label: EEG, Daewoo International; Formats: CD, CD+VCD, cassette | Asia: 1,000,000; TWN: 330,000 |
| Understand (了解) | Released: July 12, 2000; Label: EEG, Daewoo International; Formats: CD, CD+VCD, cassette | |
| The Prophecy (世紀預言) | Released: October 30, 2001; Label: EEG, Daewoo International; Formats: CD, CD+VCD, cassette | |
| Listen Up | Released: May 14, 2004; Label: EEG, Sony Music Taiwan; Formats: CD, CD+VCD, digital download | |
| Release (釋放) | Released: November 25, 2005; Label: EEG, Fashion Elements; Formats: CD, digital download | |
| Last | Released: April 29, 2009; Label: EEG, Haidie Music; Formats: CD, CD+DVD, digital download | |
| Chef Nic | Released: December 3, 2015; Label: Seed Music; Formats: CD, CD+DVD, digital download | |

== Compilation albums ==
| Title | Album details | Certifications |
|---|---|---|
| Most Wanted Nicholas Selection | Released: December 1, 1999; Label: EEG; Formats: CD, CD+VCD | IFPIHK: Platinum |
| 20 Twenty Best Selection | Released: August 19, 2000; Label: EEG; Formats: CD, CD+VCD | |
| Senses – 15 Songs Composed by Nicholas Tse | Released: March 10, 2001; Label: EEG; Formats: CD, CD+VCD | |
| Nicholas Tse Music World MD Selections | Released: June 25, 2001; Label: EEG; Formats: CD, CD+VCD | |

== Extended plays ==
| Title | Album details |
|---|---|
| Wordless Expression (無聲仿有聲) | Released: December 10, 1997; Label: Fitto Records; Formats: CD, CD+VCD |
| Cry of the End of the Century (末世紀的呼聲) | Released: December 8, 1998; Label: Fitto Records; Formats: CD |
