= Saryozen =

Saryozen (Kazakh: Сарыөзен; "Yellow River") may refer to:

- Saryozen (Irtysh basin), a river having its sources in the Myrzhyk, Abai Region, Kazakhstan
  - Sary-Uzen, a sector of the Semipalatinsk Test Site that includes the Saryozen valley, Abai Region, Kazakhstan
- Saryozen (Turgay basin), a river having its sources in the Saryadyr, Turgay Plateau, Kazakhstan
- Saryozen (Sarysu basin), a river in Ulytau Region, Kazakhstan
- Another name for the Maly Uzen river in Kazakhstan
