= Yelo, Spain =

Yelo
- Municipality
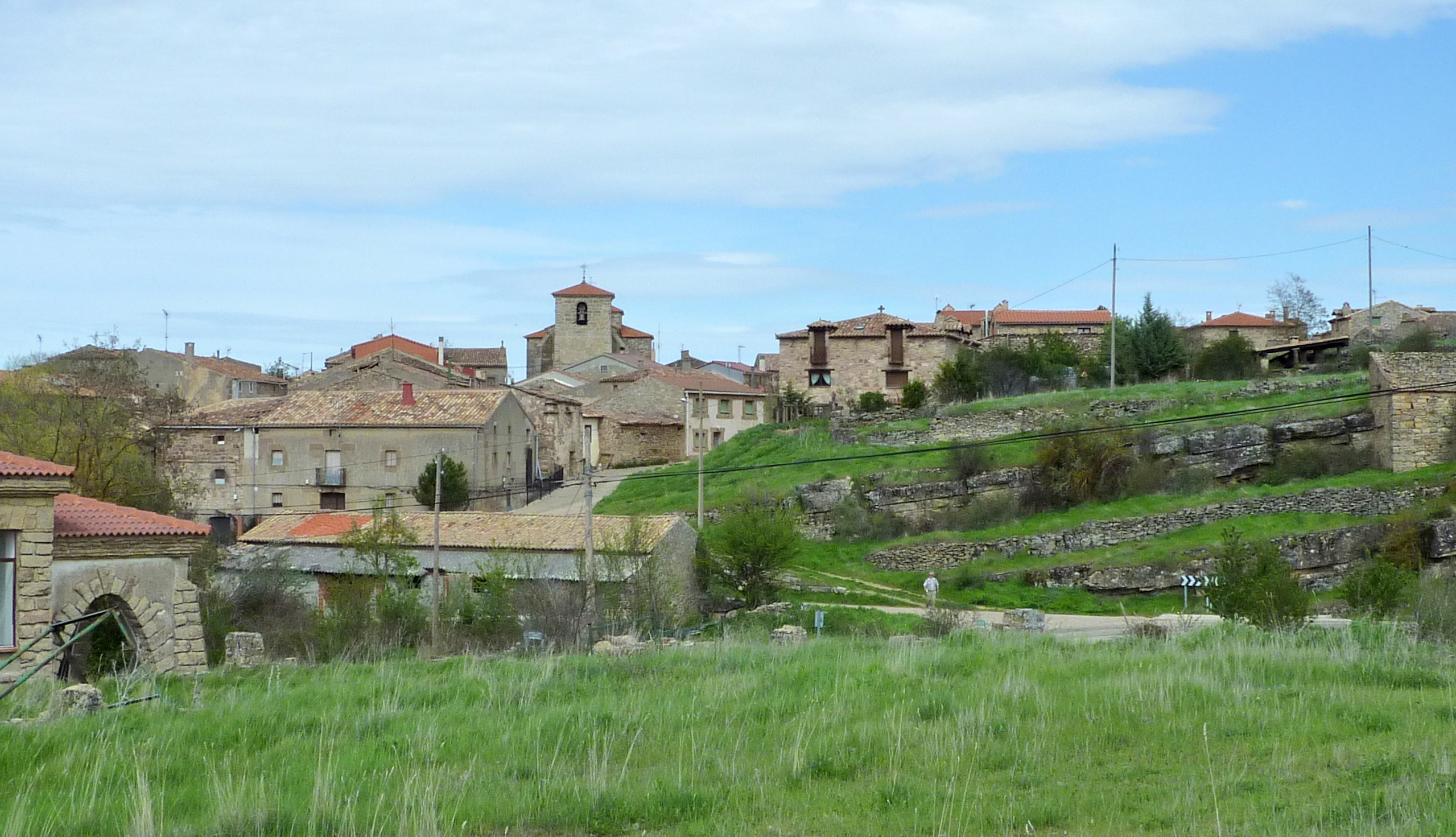

- Location in Spain. Yelo (Spain)
- Coordinates: 41°12′37″N 2°31′40″W
- Country: Spain
- Autonomous community: Castile and León
- Province: Soria
- Municipality: Yelo

Area
  - Total: 24.95 km^{2} (9.63 sq mi)
- Elevation: 1,122 m (3,681 ft)

Population (2025-01-01)
  - Total: 40
  - Density: 1.6/km^{2} (4.2/sq mi)
- Time zone: UTC+1 (CET)
  - Summer (DST): UTC+2 (CEST)

Yelo is a municipality located in the province of Soria, Castile and León, Spain. According to the 2004 census (INE), the municipality had a population of 55 inhabitants.
