= Yellow Submarine =

Yellow Submarine may refer to:

== The Beatles ==
- "Yellow Submarine" (song), released in 1966
- Yellow Submarine (film), a 1968 feature-length animated film featuring The Beatles' music
- Yellow Submarine (album), 1969 soundtrack to the film
- Yellow Submarine Songtrack, 1999 expanded remix of the Yellow Submarine album
- Yellow Submarine (sculpture), large-scale work of art at Liverpool Airport, based on the song and film
- Ringo's Yellow Submarine, 1983 radio show hosted by Ringo Starr

== Architecture ==
- Yellow Submarine (club), a nightclub in Munich, established in 1971

== Submarines ==
- Yellow Submarine, nickname for an unmanned acoustic test vehicle, originally the American submarine USS Menhaden (SS-377)
- Yellow Submarine, nickname for Quester I, built in an attempt to salvage the wreck of the SS Andrea Doria

== Sports ==
- "The Yellow Submarine", nickname for the Spanish football team Cádiz CF
- "The Yellow Submarine", nickname for the Spanish football team Villarreal CF
- "The Yellow Submarine", nickname for the Pennzoil-sponsored Indy car
