= Cucumber yellows virus =

Virus classification
- (unranked): Virus
- Realm: Riboviria
- Kingdom: Orthornavirae
- Phylum: Kitrinoviricota
- Class: Alsuviricetes
- Order: Martellivirales
- Family: Closteroviridae
- Genus: Crinivirus
- Virus: Cucumber yellows virus

Species of virus

Cucumber yellows virus (CuYV) is a species of virus that infects plants, specifically the cucumber and melon. It is transmitted by the greenhouse whitefly. The cucumber yellows virus genome was completely sequenced in 2003.
