= Prune dwarf virus =

Virus classification
- (unranked): Virus
- Realm: Riboviria
- Kingdom: Orthornavirae
- Phylum: Kitrinoviricota
- Class: Alsuviricetes
- Order: Martellivirales
- Family: Bromoviridae
- Genus: Ilarvirus
- Species: Ilarvirus PDV

Synonyms
- cherry chlorotic ringspot virus peach stunt virus sour cherry yellows virus

Species of virus

Prune dwarf virus (PDV) is an economically important plant pathogenic virus affecting Prunus species globally. PDV is found worldwide due to easy transmission through seed, pollen, and vegetative propagation. The virus is in the family Bromoviridae an important family of plant RNA viruses containing six genera, including Alfamovirus, Ilarvirus, Bromovirus, Amularvirus, Oleavirus, and Cucumovirus. PDV belongs to the genera Ilarvirus. It can cause dwarfism of leaves on certain prune and plum plants. It will also cause yellows in sour cherry, especially when present with Prunus necrotic ringspot virus. There are no known transmission vectors, though the pollen of infected cherry trees has been found to infect other cherry trees a small percent of the time.

== Hosts and symptoms ==
All cultivated species of the genus Prunus including plums, cherries (sour and sweet), almonds, peaches, and apricots, are susceptible to PDV. PDV causes more damage to Prunus than PNRSV. Symptoms are variable and depend on climate, virus isolate, host species, and cultivar. Common symptoms of PDV are stunting of the tree, necrosis, and chlorosis. Symptoms of PDV in peach include darker green foliage, rosette formation in developing shoots, shortened internodes, and reduction in both plant and fruit growth. Frequently, PDV occurs in mix infections with other ilarviruses, like PNRSV. Mixed infection of PDV and PNRSV reduce yield by up to 60% in peach, along with bark splitting and increased sucker production.

== Peach stunt disease ==
PDV and PNRSV are the most common viruses affecting peach in the southeastern US. PDV and PNRSV can cause disease independently of each other or can co-infect, resulting in a synergistic interaction causing a distinct dwarfing disease called peach stunt. Peach stunt disease symptoms include stunting, defoliation, reduced fruit yield, reduction in trunk circumference, and doubled production of water sprouts.

== Transmission ==
Transmission of PDV mainly occurs through pollen, seed, and vegetative propagation (grafting and budding). PDV infected pollen can be transmitted from tree to tree (horizontal transmission) and from parent to progeny (vertical transmission). Seed transmission for PDV has been confirmed in various Prunus species. In P. mahaleb, a cherry rootstock, the major method of PDV dispersal is through seed and can result in 40% to 50% seed transmission efficiency. PDV is regularly inspected in inmported seeds from P. cerasifera, P. Persia, P. armeniaca, P. avian, P. mandshurica, P. serotina, and P. cerasus.

Although there are no known transmission vectors for PDV, there are virus facilitators. Bees have been found to facilitate the transmission of PDV through infected PDV-infected pollen from infected trees to healthy trees, Additionally, thrips have also been shown to help facilitate the transmission of PDV and PNRSV by the creation of mechanical wounds allowing for virus transmission.

== Properties, structure, and genome ==
PDV is a multicomponent virus. Virions of PDV are unenveloped and have varying symmetries from quasi-isometric to bacilliform.

The PDV genome is divided into three segmented positive sense single-stranded (SS) RNA. RNA1 and RNA2 each has only a single ORF, encodes P1 protein and P2 protein, respectively. RNA3 possesses two ORFs which encodes movement protein (MP) and the viral coat protein (CP), respectively. Each of these RNA segments is individually packaged into viral capsids. The P1 protein encoded by ORF1 is an enzymatic protein with two domains, a methyltransferase domain and C-proximal domain, and is involved in the viral RNA replication process The P2 protein encoded by ORF2 is the RNA-dependent RNA polymerase (RdRp) part of the replicase enzyme. Most likely, the P1 and P2 proteins together form the RNA replication complex.

== Phylogeny ==
A phylogenetic study based on recombinant-free MP and CP sequences clustered global PDV isolates into three main groups. However, the phylogenetic trees based on P1 and P2 regions did not share the similar topology of MP and CP. Additional P1 and P2 sequences are still in need to fully understand PDV evolution.

== Management and control ==
Inspection of PDV and other quarantine viruses was done using enzyme-linked immunosorbent assay (ELISA). Yet, due to low sensitivity and false positive reactions, other methods liked RT-PCR and PCR have been explored due to their higher detection sensitivity. Additionally, early detection of PDV in propagative material is important for control and sustainable agriculture.

Phytosanitary certification schemes are applied to fruit trees this allows for the production of planting material with known variety and health status and allows for controlling the propagation of virus-tested mother plants.
