= Asparagus virus 1 =

Virus classification
- (unranked): Virus
- Realm: Riboviria
- Kingdom: Orthornavirae
- Phylum: Pisuviricota
- Class: Stelpaviricetes
- Order: Patatavirales
- Family: Potyviridae
- Genus: Potyvirus
- Species: Potyvirus asparagi

Synonyms
- Asparagus virus 1; Asparagus virus B

Species of virus

Asparagus virus 1 (AV-1) is one of the nine known viruses that infects asparagus plants. It is a member of the genus Potyvirus in the family Potyviridae. Initially reported by G. L Hein in 1960, it causes no distinct symptoms in asparagus plants. The only known natural plant host is the asparagus. It is spread by aphid vectors, which means that aphids do not cause the AV-1, but they do spread it.

== Morphology ==
The virion is non-enveloped, filamentous, and flexuous with helical symmetry. Particles are 700-800 nm long and 13 nm wide. Axial canal is indistinct and the basic helix is obscure.

== Physicochemical and physical properties ==
There is one sedimenting component(s) found in purified preparations. The sedimentation coefficient is 1.46 S. A260/A280 ratio is 1.24. The thermal inactivation point (TIP) is at 50-55 °C. The longevity in vitro (LIV) is 2–11 days. Although the titer is dependent on the host, the decimal exponent (DEX) of the dilution endpoint is usually around 3-4.

== Genome ==
The genome is monopartite, positive-sense, single-stranded RNA of 9.7kbp The RNA has a viral protein genome-linked at its 5' end, while its 3' end is polyadenylated. The viral genome contains two open reading frames (ORF), one of which is a polyprotein that is cleaved into 10 polypeptides, while the other short ORF encodes a single protein. The genome constitutes approximately 6% of the virion by weight.

== Proteome ==
The viral genome encodes both structural proteins and non-structural proteins typical of potyviruses. This includes P1, HC-Pro, P3, 6K2, CI, 6K2, NIa-Pro, NIb, VPg, CP, and P3N-PIPO.

== Antigenicity ==
The virus is serologically related to bean yellow mosaic, lettuce mosaic, and turnip mosaic viruses. The virus does not show serological relationships to beet mosaic, iris mild mosaic, and potato Y viruses.

== Transmission and vector relationships ==
The virus is transmitted in a non-persistent manner by arthropods of the order Hemiptera, family Aphididae; Aphis craccivora, Myzus persicae. The principal natural vector is M. persicae. The virus is not transmitted by Aphis gossypii, Macrosiphum euphorbiae.

Interestingly, AV-1 was not transmitted by one of the most severe pests of asparagus, the European asparagus aphid (Brachycorynella asparagus), in a laboratory setting.

== Host range and symptoms ==
Asparagus virus 1 has a very limited host range: asparagus is the only natural host but certain other species have been successfully inoculated with AV-1 in a laboratory setting. Many hosts exhibit no visual symptoms. For instance, asparagus, Cucumis sativus, Phaseolus vulgaris, or Nicotiana tabacum have not been observed to develop any acute symptoms in lab settings, though AV-1 is often diagnosed in asparagus crops which are visibly wilted or infected by fungal pathogens. This may either be due to sampling bias or AV-1 may increase the host's susceptibility to biotic and abiotic stress. AV-1 does cause local necrotic lesions in mechanically inoculated Chenopodium quinoa leaves and systemic mottle in Nicotiana benthamiana.

AV-1-infected asparagus crops are often also infected with tobacco streak, Asparagus virus 2, or cucumber mosaic viruses.

Under the experimental conditions, susceptibility to being infected by the viruses is found in several families. Susceptible host species are found in the Alliaceae, Amaranthaceae, Asparagaceae, Chenopodiaceae, Tetragoniaceae. The following species were susceptible to experimental virus infection: Allium tuberosum, Asparagus officinalis, Chenopodium album, Chenopodium amaranticolor, Chenopodium capitatum, Chenopodium quinoa, Gomphrena globosa, Tetragonia tetragonioides.

Families containing insusceptible hosts:

- Alliaceae
- Amaranthaceae
- Caryophyllaceae
- Chenopodiaceae
- Compositae
- Cruciferae
- Cucurbitaceae
- Gramineae
- Labiatae
- Leguminosae-Papilionoideae
- Liliaceae
- Pedaliaceae, or Solanaceae, Umbelliferae.

Species inoculated with the virus that do not show signs of susceptibility:

- Allium cepa
- Allium fistulosum
- Amaranthus retroflexus
- Apium graveolens
- Beta vulgaris
- Brassica campestris ssp. rapa
- Capsicum frutescens
- Celosia cristata
- Chenopodium murale
- Cucumis sativus
- Cucurbita pepo
- Datura stramonium
- Daucus carota
- Dianthus caryophyllus
- Glycine max,
- Gomphrena globosa
- Lactuca sativa
- Lilium elegans
- Lycopersicon esculentum
- Nicotiana benthamiana
- Nicotiana clevelandii
- Nicotiana glutinosa
- Nicotiana sylvestris
- Nicotiana tabacum
- Ocimum basilicum
- Petunia x hybrida
- Phaseolus vulgaris
- Pisum sativum
- Sesamum indicum
- Solanum tuberosum
- Vicia faba
- Vigna unguiculata
- Vigna unguiculata ssp. sesquipedalis
- Zea mays
- Zinnia elegans

== Maintenance and propagation hosts ==
The most commonly used maintenance and propagation host species are Asparagus officinalis, Chenopodium amaranticolor, C. quinoa, Tetragonia tetragonioides.

== Histopathology ==
The virus can be best detected in leaves, stems, roots, and mesophyll of the infected plant. Virions are found in the cytoplasm.

== Cytopathology ==
Inclusions are present in infected cells. Inclusion bodies in the host cell are found in the cytoplasm. Cytoplasmic inclusions are pinwheels. Inclusions do not contain mature virions.

== Geographical distribution ==
Well-documented cases of AV-1 have been reported in Germany, Japan, the United States of America, and Italy. The virus is likely to be distributed worldwide wherever asparagus is grown commercially.

== Notes ==
- Asparagus infected with Asparagus 1 and 2 viruses are significantly more susceptible to damage caused by Fusarium oxysporum f. sp. asparagi.
