= Tomato aspermy virus =

Virus classification
- (unranked): Virus
- Realm: Riboviria
- Kingdom: Orthornavirae
- Phylum: Kitrinoviricota
- Class: Alsuviricetes
- Order: Martellivirales
- Family: Bromoviridae
- Genus: Cucumovirus
- Species: Cucmovirus TAV

Synonyms
- chrysanthemum mild mottle virus; chrysanthemum mosaic virus; chrysanthemum aspermy virus

Species of virus

Tomato aspermy virus (TAV) is a plant pathogenic virus of the family Bromoviridae.
