= CLRV (disambiguation) =

The Canadian Light Rail Vehicle was a type of streetcar that was used in Toronto, Canada.

CLRV may also refer to:

- Cherry leaf roll virus, a plant pathogenic virus
- Citrus leaf rugose virus, a plant pathogenic virus
