= AV1 (disambiguation) =

AV1 may refer to:

- AOMedia Video 1, a video format created by the Alliance for Open Media
- AV1 (robot), a telepresence robot.
- AV input number one, a television connector commonly labeled "AV1" or "AV-1".
- Canon AV-1, a camera introduced by Canon in 1979, so named because of its user selectable aperture value.
- Asparagus virus 1, a plant disease.
- Alta Via 1, a footpath in Italy
- A V 1, a 1998 album by Dave Allinson and Phill Brown
