= BMV =

BMV may refer to:

- Latin: Beatae Mariae Virginis of the Blessed Virgin Mary (mother of Jesus)
- Spanish: Bolsa Mexicana de Valores, Mexican Stock Exchange
- Brome mosaic virus
- Bureau of Motor Vehicles
- ISO 639-3 language code for the Bum language
- IATA airport code for Buôn Ma Thuột Airport, Vietnam
- Bergen Mekaniske Verksted, a shipyard in Norway
- Balloon mitral valvotomy, intervention done in mitral stenosis
- Below Market Value, in relation to property (real estate) for sale.
- An approximate pronunciation of BMW in the German language

== See also ==
- BMW, German car manufacturer
- BWV
