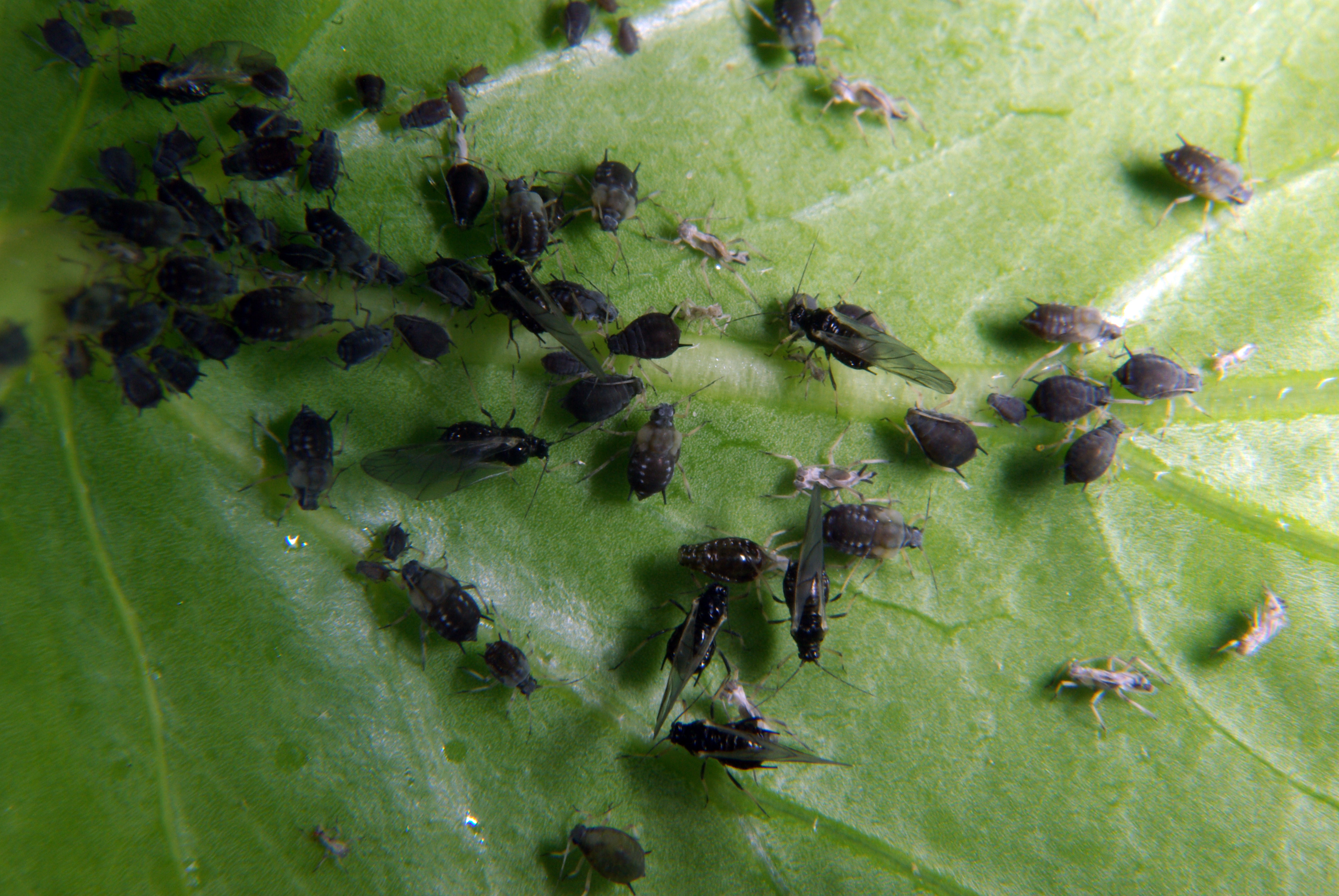

Scientific classification
- Kingdom: Animalia
- Phylum: Arthropoda
- Clade: Pancrustacea
- Class: Insecta
- Order: Hemiptera
- Suborder: Sternorrhyncha
- Family: Aphididae
- Genus: Aphis
- Species: A. craccivora

Binomial name
- Aphis craccivora C.L.Koch, 1854

= Aphis craccivora =

Species of true bug

Aphis craccivora, variously known as the cowpea aphid, groundnut aphid or black legume aphid, is a true bug in the family Aphididae. Originally of probable Palearctic origin, it is now an invasive species of cosmopolitan distribution.

== Description ==
Aphis craccivora is a small species of aphid. The female has a glossy black or dark brown body with a prominent cauda (tail-like protrusion), and legs in some shade of brown or yellow. The antennae have six segments and these and the limb segments, cauda and cornicles are pale proximally (close to the body) and dark distally (further from the body). The adults do not have wax on their dorsal surface but the nymphs are lightly dusted with wax. Winged females are up to 2.2 mm (0.1 in) long and have cross-barring on the abdomen. Wingless females are a little smaller.

== Distribution ==
Aphis craccivora is believed to be Palearctic in origin but has expanded its range so that now it is near cosmopolitan. In recent years its range has extended further north in Siberia and Canada and further south in Chile and Argentina. It is abundant in the Mediterranean area and subtropics and in the tropics it is one of the most common aphid species. Infests cowpea in India, the Philippines, Thailand, the southern United States, tropical Africa, and Latin America.

== Hosts ==
Aphis craccivora is polyphagous, meaning it feeds on a large number of different species of plant, but it seems to have a preference for members of the bean family. Other plant families sometimes acting as hosts include Asteraceae, Brassicaceae, Caryophyllaceae, Chenopodiaceae, Cucurbitaceae, Malvaceae, Ranunculaceae, Rosaceae and Solanaceae. Crops attacked by this aphid include brassicas, cucurbits, beetroot, peanut, cotton, cowpeas, chickpeas and cardamom.

== Life cycle ==
In the former USSR, Aphis craccivora overwinters as eggs, often at the base of young alfalfa plants, but is also reported to overwinter on Acacia, camelthorn and perennial weeds. The eggs hatch in early spring and the first larvae are known as fundatrix (stem mothers) and feed at first on alfalfa. These aphids are all female and reproduce by parthenogenesis, producing nymphs which moult four times over the course of eight to twelve days. By the end of April, winged females have migrated to other host plants, often Acacia, and later to cotton, on which crop this pest does much damage. It may move back to alfalfa later in the year. In Belarus, lupine is an important host plant and in Ukraine, Acacia is most affected. A female aphid lives for 9 to 25 days and can produce from 25 to 125 young during its life. There may be up to twenty generations in the year. By November winged forms have developed and eggs are laid before winter sets in.

In warmer climates, parthenogenetic reproduction takes place throughout the year. The winged male insects are seldom encountered but have been observed in Germany, India and Argentina. The aphids tend to concentrate on the growing tips of plants, young leaves, shoots, flowers and developing seed pods. They are often tended by ants which feed on the secretions they produce and deter predators. Natural enemies include parasitic wasps, ladybirds, lacewing larvae and hoverfly larvae.

== Damage ==
Aphis craccivora causes direct damage to plants by stunting and distorting growth. The honeydew produced is deposited on the plants and encourages the growth of sooty moulds which restrict photosynthesis. The aphid is the vector of a number of plant viruses including groundnut rosette virus, peanut mottle virus, peanut stunt virus, subterranean clover stunt virus, bean common mosaic virus, cucumber mosaic virus and alfalfa mosaic virus.
