= Pelargonium zonate spot virus =

Virus classification
- (unranked): Virus
- Realm: Riboviria
- Kingdom: Orthornavirae
- Phylum: Kitrinoviricota
- Class: Alsuviricetes
- Order: Martellivirales
- Family: Bromoviridae
- Genus: Anulavirus
- Species: Anulavirus PZSV

Species of virus

Pelargonium zonate spot virus (PZSV) is a plant pathogenic virus, classified in the Bromoviridae family, genus Anulavirus.
