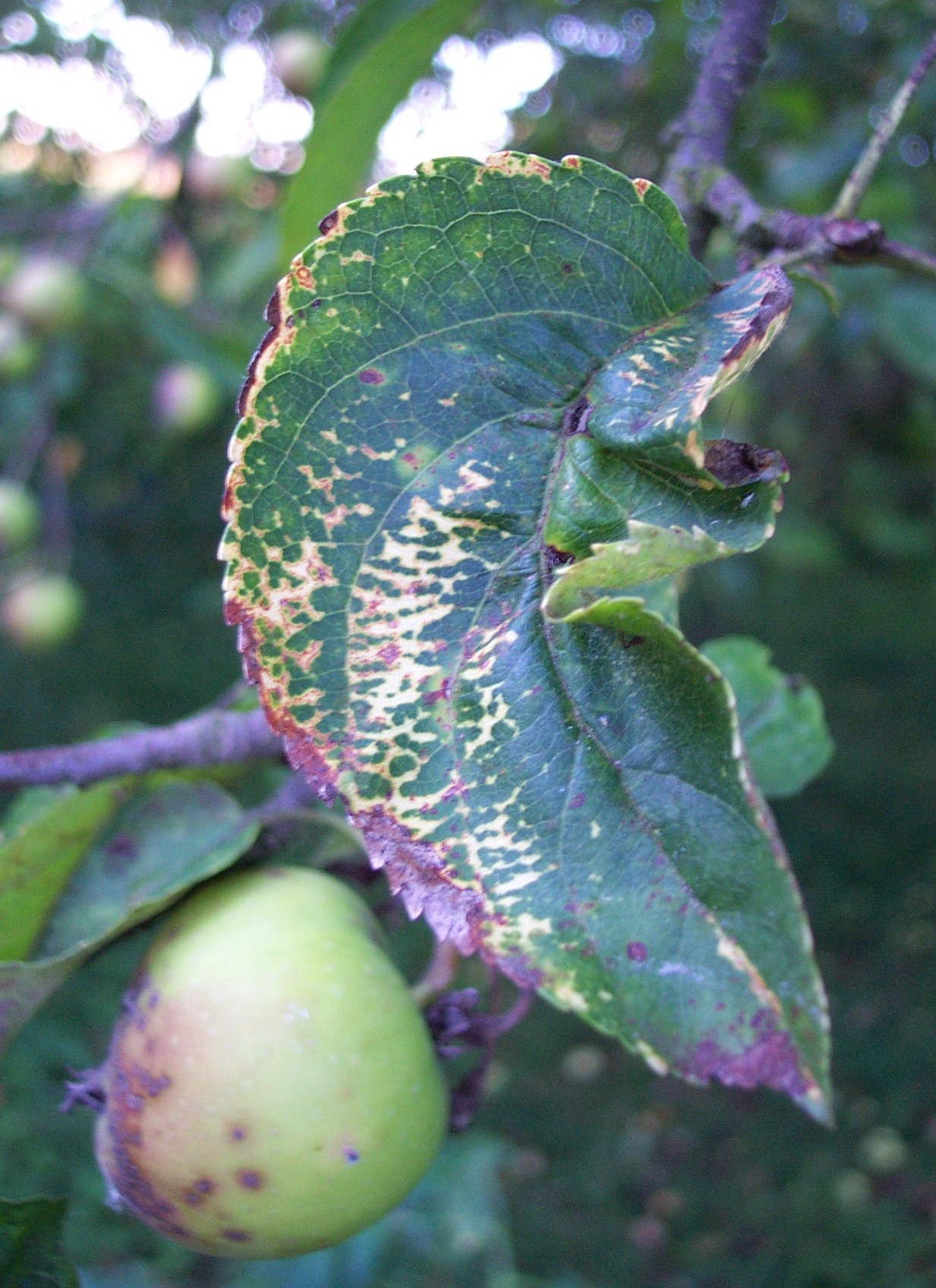
- Apple tree infected with apple mosaic virus

Virus classification
- (unranked): Virus
- Realm: Riboviria
- Kingdom: Orthornavirae
- Phylum: Kitrinoviricota
- Class: Alsuviricetes
- Order: Martellivirales
- Family: Bromoviridae
- Genus: Ilarvirus
- Species: Ilarvirus ApMV

Synonyms
- Birch line pattern virus Birch ringspot virus Dutch plum line pattern virus European plum line pattern virus Hop A virus Horse chestnut yellow mosaic virus Rose mosaic virus

= Apple mosaic virus =

Species of virus

Apple mosaic virus (ApMV) is a plant pathogenic virus of the family Bromoviridae. It is named after its symptoms that were first present on apples. ApMV is a positive sense RNA based virus. The disease itself has several synonyms including Mild Apple Mosaic Virus, Hop Virus, Rose Mosaic Virus, and European Plum Line Patten Virus. It causes a severe yield reduction and decreased life-expectancy of fruit trees.

== Hosts, transmission, and symptoms ==
=== Host range ===
ApMV has a diverse host range. These positive-sense single-stranded RNA viruses are capable of infecting over 65 species in 19 different families including different types of woody and herbaceous plants. This virus can infect either experimentally or naturally. Some of the natural hosts that are commonly targeted by ApMV include apples (Malus domestica), pears (Pyrus communis), apricots (Prunus armeniaca), peach (Prunus persica), plum (Prunus domestica), strawberry (Fragaria sp.), and hazelnut (Corylus avellana).

=== Transmission ===
ApMV is primarily transmitted via root grafting and via infected vegetative propagation equipment. These two transmission routes are the primary source of inoculum for the virus. Experimentally, the virus can be sap-transmitted by mechanical inoculations especially to herbaceous plants such as periwinkle (Vinca rosea) and cucumber (Cucumis sativus). Furthermore, ApMV is not currently thought to be seed or pollen transmitted due to limited time and space within studies. There have also been no reported insect vectors for the virus.

=== Symptoms ===
ApMV can differ from showing no symptoms to showing many symptoms on its leaf. Most popular apple cultivars are asymptomatic after infection. For plants that display symptoms, it may take up to two years to develop these symptoms. Additionally, sensitive varieties of the disease tend to have different symptoms. Possible symptoms produced tend to vary from white gray mottling on field maple to yellow chlorotic spots on hawthorn leaves. There is an Apple Necrotic Mosaic Virus (ApNMV) which is a very similar virus but displays signs of necrosis. Furthermore, in plum trees, ApMV can cause line-pattern symptoms, while in roses, the symptoms are mosaic. However, the most common host, the apple tree, tends to produce pale yellow irregular spots or bands along the major veins on the leaves as they expand in the spring. The amount and severity of infected leaves with ApMV has a large dependence on temperature. Severe symptoms are pronounced during moderate spring temperatures. Partial symptoms are also commonly expressed in apple trees infected with ApMV. A Danish study conducted from 1958 to 1960 showed that the expression of partial symptoms are possible only a year after inoculation. Overall plants with ApMV, both moderate and severe strains, have been shown to reduce growth to 42% and decrease fruit quality.

== Management ==
The most efficient way to manage the disease is through preventative measures and avoid planting contaminated material. Since these viruses cannot be directly removed from the plant itself, the most practical technique to manage ApMV is to plant certified trees obtained from Plant Improvement Organizations . Because ApMV can be asymptomatic for quite a while, it is also best to test for the pathogen using high sensitivity and high specificity detection methods such as ELISA.

Various other techniques have been utilized to eliminate the virus from diseased plant species. A common technique used in the past is thermotherapy. Since many viruses are sensitive to elevated temperatures, utilizing heat treatment in a controlled growth chamber will deplete the symptoms for the following years. A study by Hunter et al. 1959 was conducted, where buds from virus infected trees were grafted onto healthy trees. The healthy trees with the buds were then incubated at 37 °C for 28, 30, 36 and 40 days. A year following the incubation, there were no symptoms present on the healthy tree other than from the buds. However, a potential drawback to this study was that the plants were not tested for more than a year, and sometimes symptoms can take up to two years to develop. Other studies have also reported similar results. Another study conducted by Pandey et al. (1972) suggested that plant exposure to temperatures of 40 degrees Celsius or 50 degrees Celsius for, respectively, 30 and 15 minutes were successful in inactivating ApMV. This inactivation was ultimately tested by the ELISA detection method. On the contrary, lower temperatures and low heat durations have commonly failed to inactivate the virus.

Another method that has been tested is cross protection. Cross protection is a type of induced resistance that is developed among plants against viruses. During this event, a prior infection with one virus may offer protection against another closely related viruses. This technique has been tested on Johnathon apples. Healthy strains of the Johnathon apples were infected with a mild strain of ApMV and then further exposed to viral infections by moderate and severe strains. The trees infected with the mild strains were found to be resistant by further attack of the virus.

All in all, as stated above, the best way to manage ApMV is through prevention. Utilizing sterile equipment and plant certified trees are the most efficient ways to get ApMV free crops. Other methods such as thermotherapy and cross protection have also been used in the past.

== Environment ==
ApMV infects crops from all around the world including Denmark, Turkey, South Africa, New Zealand, England, Germany, Canada, Italy, Spain and the United States, including as far north as Alaska. It has even stretched to Japan and China.

ApMV prefers areas where there is a clear distinction between the spring and summer seasons. Most samples of plants are commonly collected in the spring time for molecular determination of ApMV using ELISA. This is vital because concentration of ApMV is highly varied from season to season. ApMV is known to be a labile virus because its concentrations are negatively affected by high temperatures. In a study completed by Svoboda and Polák, they observed five symptomless apple trees infected with ApMV. These five symptomless trees were selected from a pool of 472 apple trees that were inoculated with ApMV in two different orchards. Samples of various plant tissue from young leaves, flower petal, dormant buds, and phloem were taken at different time of the vegetation period. In this study, ELISA was used to detect ApMV in the different samples from the five apple trees. Not all pathogens resulting in Apple Mosaic Virus Disease are detected using ELISA, as novel ilavirus is not detectable in an ELISA test.

The relative concentrations of the virus in the leaves and flower were highest in the earlier spring months such as March and April. This suggests that the virus propagates better when it is under colder weather conditions. Furthermore, during cooler months, the virus's relative concentration is highest in the leaf and flower, rather than the phloem and dormant bud. Once May and June occur, the relative concentrations of the disease severely decreases. This was evident by Svoboda and Polák's study because as the temperature rose from spring to summer, the ELISA test detected lower relative concentrations of ApMV. As a result of this heat sensitivity, symptoms of ApMV tend to be masked in the summer months versus the spring months.
