= Tree spinach =

Tree spinach may refer to:

- Cnidoscolus aconitifolius
- Chenopodium giganteum
