= Tulare apple mosaic virus =

Virus classification
- (unranked): Virus
- Realm: Riboviria
- Kingdom: Orthornavirae
- Phylum: Kitrinoviricota
- Class: Alsuviricetes
- Order: Martellivirales
- Family: Bromoviridae
- Genus: Ilarvirus
- Species: Ilarvirus TAMV

Species of virus

Tulare apple mosaic virus (TAMV) is a plant pathogenic virus of the family Bromoviridae.
