= GRV =

GRV may refer to:

- Gaussian random variable, a variable in normal distribution in statistics
- Gawler Range Volcanics, a geological event in South Australia
- Gravesend railway station, England
- Greenville station (South Carolina), a train station
- Greyhound Racing Victoria
- Gross rock volume, a calculation used in hydrocarbon exploration
- Groundnut rosette virus, a plant pathogen
- Grozny Airport, in Chechnya, Russia
- GRV, the ISO code of the Central Grebo language
