= Elm mottle virus =

Virus classification
- (unranked): Virus
- Realm: Riboviria
- Kingdom: Orthornavirae
- Phylum: Kitrinoviricota
- Class: Alsuviricetes
- Order: Martellivirales
- Family: Bromoviridae
- Genus: Ilarvirus
- Species: Ilarvirus EMoV

Synonyms
- Hydrangea mosaic virus (tentative); Lilac streak mosaic virus; Lilac white mosaic virus

Species of virus

Elm mottle virus (EMoV) is a species of plant pathogenic virus in the family Bromoviridae.
