= Blueberry shock virus =

Virus classification
- (unranked): Virus
- Realm: Riboviria
- Kingdom: Orthornavirae
- Phylum: Kitrinoviricota
- Class: Alsuviricetes
- Order: Martellivirales
- Family: Bromoviridae
- Genus: Ilarvirus
- Species: Ilarvirus BSV

Species of virus

Blueberry shock virus (BlShV) is an Ilarvirus belonging to the Bromoviridae family. The Bromoviridae family contains single-stranded, positive-sense RNA viruses. Virus particles are icosahedral and 30 nm in diameter. Blueberry shock virus causes shock of blueberries in Oregon, Washington, and British Columbia. It gets its name because plants are shocked by the initial infection, meaning the flowers and foliage blight and wilt in the early spring, right when the plant is in full bloom. BIShV was first discovered in a blueberry field containing highbush blueberry (Vaccinium corymbosum L.) in Washington in 1991. It continued to spread to Oregon, Washington and British Columbia since that time. In 2009, the disease was found in a western Michigan field, and may be preset in Pennsylvania as of 2011. Since its discovery, eradication is in progress to eliminate the disease and reduce loss of yield from it.

== Transmission ==
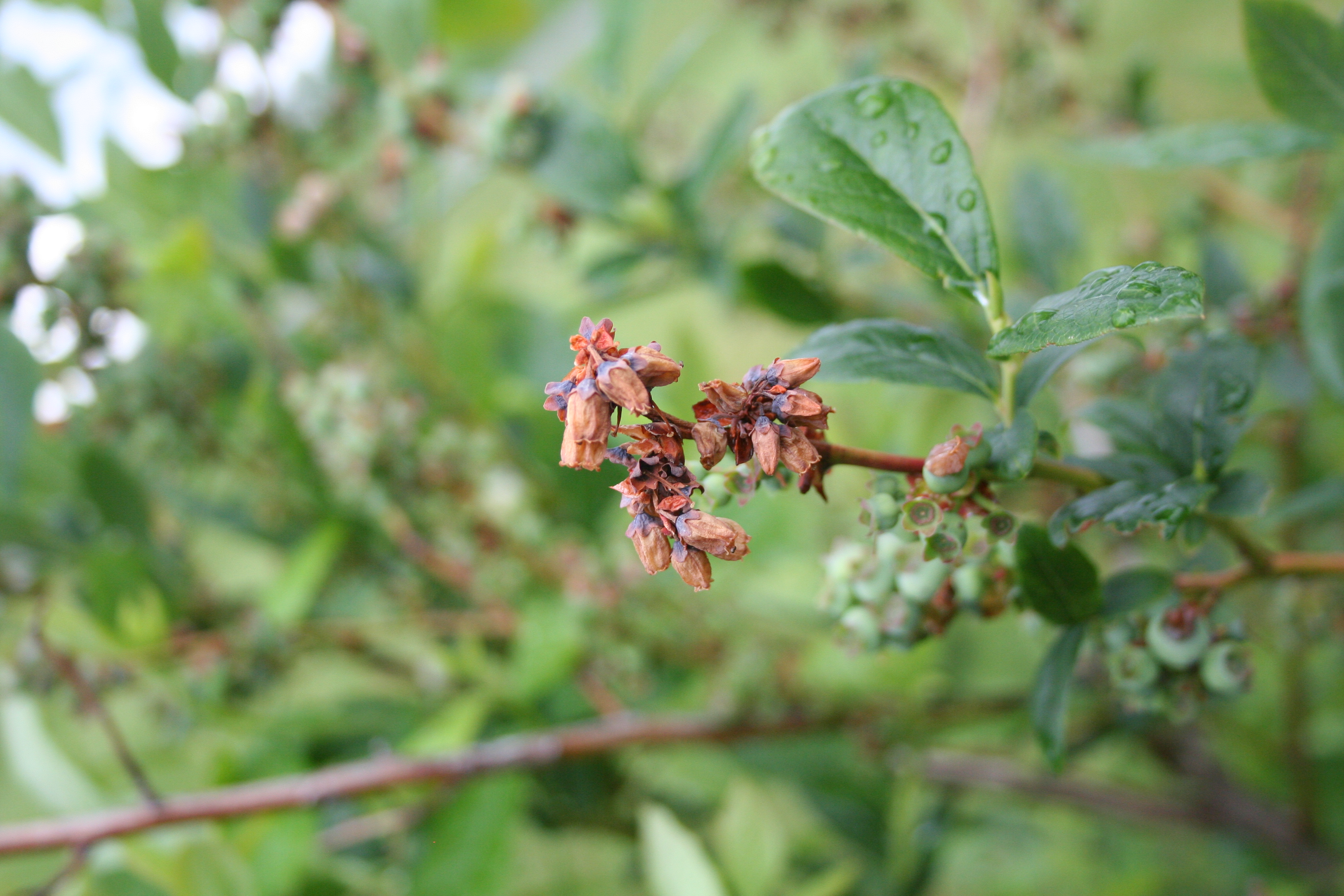
BSIV-2

Blueberry shock virus is pollen-borne and likely infects during pollination. Bees and other pollinators are the main vectors for the virus. Insects that do not act as pollinators, such as thrips and several types of flies, are not known to transmit the disease. The virus can spread quickly once established in the field. Once infected, the plant suffers from flower and leaf blight and dieback. Symptoms begin to appear just prior to bloom and can continue to develop during bloom. Eventually, after one to two years the shoots grow back and the infected plant may regain fruit production again. When the plants fully recover, they once again produce a full crop. However, their pollen will continue to be a source of inoculum and spread the virus to other blueberry plants, making it difficult to control. Management of the disease involves preventing introduction of the virus to non-infected plants. Suckers and plant material should be tested for the virus before introduction into a nursery or field. If plants do become infected with the disease either the few plants infected can be removed and burned or the whole field may need to be. Herbicides are also sprayed to ensure that the root is killed, leaving no infected suckers in the ground. Research has shown that yields are not significantly affected in recovered bushes.

== Hosts and symptoms ==
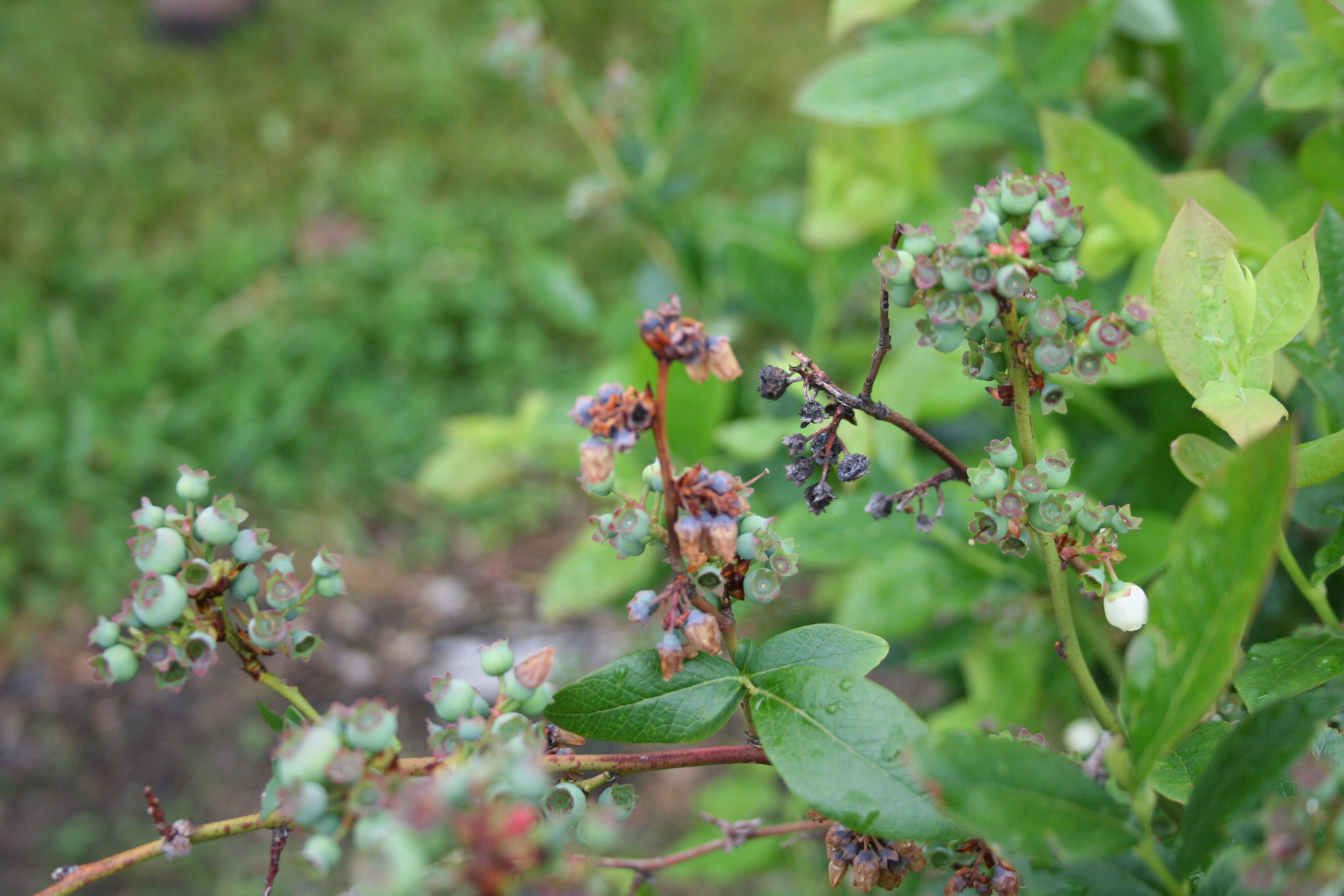
Blueberry bush infected by blueberry shock virus

Blueberry shock virus infects a variety of different blueberry cultivars. Some of the blueberry shock virus hosts include: Berkeley, Bluecrop, Bluegold, Bluetta, Blu-ray, Duke, Earliblue, Liberty, and Pemberton. Blueberries are the only known host of blueberry shock virus, however, recent research papers show cranberries may also be susceptible to the virus. All blueberry cultivars are thought to be susceptible to the virus, however, there has yet to be an extensive trial with the different varieties and cultivars. If a cultivar does experience tolerance and the plant does not suffer from loss of fruit production, it can still transmit the virus to other plants. The blueberry shock virus infection normally takes 1–2 years to develop symptoms. Symptoms include sudden death of blossoms and young vegetative shoots just before bloom. Symptoms typically develop on one or two branches of the blueberry bush but will eventually spread to the roots and all other parts of the plant. Blueberry shock virus gets its name by the initial shock that it causes to the plant. The year after infection, the plant exhibits a "shock reaction" where the flowers and foliage blight and wilt in the early spring right when the plant is in full bloom. At this stage in disease, blueberry scorch virus and blueberry shock virus look similar. However, the two can be differentiated based on the patchiness of the healthy and infected bushes and a second flourish of leaves later in the season associated with blueberry shock virus. By late summer, the blighted tissues fall from the blueberry plant and a new group of leaves develops during the summer. The common symptoms of blueberry shock virus are dieback and flower necrosis, defoliation, and lacking fruit. In addition, infected young leaves may develop blackened streaks under the center vein. The cultivar Rubel may show red flecks on the leaves the year after initial infection. Once symptoms are established, they are maintained for 1–4 years. After the three or four years, the blueberry bush can go back to producing fruit, flowers, and foliage; however, they may still have curved tips of dead shoots. This recovery includes the plant's yields, which return to normal after the initial symptoms. Although they no longer may show the symptoms of blueberry shock virus, they are still carriers of the virus. Blueberry shock virus symptoms may resemble other diseases such as blueberry scorch virus, mummy berry shoot strikes, Phomopsis twig blight, and Botrytis blossom blight. Blueberry shock virus is differentiated and diagnosed from these other diseases based on the following characteristics:

1. Patchiness of healthy and infected bushes
2. No fungal growth on infected plant parts
3. Green leaves mixed with blighted leaves on the same shoot
4. A second batch of leaves flourishing later in the season

These features and symptoms of blueberry shock virus differentiate them for other diseases with similar symptoms. Additionally, virus symptoms are influenced by many abiotic factors such as time of the year, weather, and type of cultivar. Due to degree of severity, some plants may only show dieback of leaves and flower necrosis on infected branches, while others will show the initial shock reaction that includes dieback of leaves and a second flush developing later in the season.

== Disease cycle ==
The vector(s) – generally honeybees – pick up infected pollen from an already infected plant that is either recovered or newly infected from a pre-existing infected plant. The vector travels and pollinates an uninfected plant, thus spreading new infection – commonly known to occur during blooming time of the season. Flowers are the avenues of the infection and pollinators are involved in the form of inoculation. The virus can survive in the hive of a vector for more than 1 week but no more than 2 weeks but must be within pollen to survive (it does not remain in the vector itself). The virus can be transferred between hives via vectors, increasing spread possibility from field to field. The rate of spread within a field varies by cultivar; the spread is very rapid in Berkeley, Bluegold, Bluetta, Earliblue, Liberty, and Pemberton, and slow in Bluecrop, Duke, and Blu-ray. Virus spread is most likely between cultivars that flower during the same period. The virus replicates as a single positive strand of RNA and particles remain between, on, and in the pollen cells of hosts or hives. The virus develops prior to and during bloom, affecting new tissues by turning them black, and older tissues by turning them turn orange. Foliage withers and dies either systemically or partially as individual branches. Plants can remain symptomless for up to 4 years yet will test positive for the virus. Symptoms may or may not occur in a way the plant undergoes a shock – blighting and foliage dies off leaving a bare, leafless plant that may or may not recover. The plant may recover and look like it goes back to normal, even though the plant is now a virus reservoir. Recovered plants are often the source of inoculum that will infect healthy plants, as no symptoms are shown. This makes viral testing important for blueberry producers to stop the spread. In addition, the fruit production is observed to be abnormal after inoculation and shock. If a plant survives the virus, it is possible to produce normal yield again, however it can still be a reservoir for the virus . Pollinators will use infected plant's pollen to pollinate healthy plants simultaneously spreading virus. Additionally, the virus is not transmitted via direct contact between plants and is unlikely to occur via pruning shears.

== Environment ==
In order for the blueberry shock virus to be successful, there must be a susceptible environment. The blueberry shock virus originated in the Pacific Northwest, which means the environment must be cool and somewhat moist. Another factor that leads to survival is spreading. The blueberry shock virus spreads by pollination; therefore, spreading only occurs in spring when pollinators are active. Honey bees are one of the main pollinators of blueberries. The activity of the Honey bee is most productive at temperatures between 60 and 105 degrees Fahrenheit. When wind speed reaches 25 mph, the honey bee activity is completely halted; therefore spread of the virus would be decreased. The virus within pollen grains can survive in the beehive for one to two weeks, which can contribute to the spread of the virus. The virus is mostly spread by pollen; therefore, thrips, aphids, and whiteflies are not vectors for blueberry shock virus. Blueberry cultivars can also contribute to the rate of infection. In Berkeley, Bluegold, Bluetta, Erliblue, Liberty, and Pemberton varieties, spreading of the virus occurs quickly. On the other hand, Bluecrop, Duke, and Blu-ray varieties of blueberry have a limited rate of spreading.

== Management ==
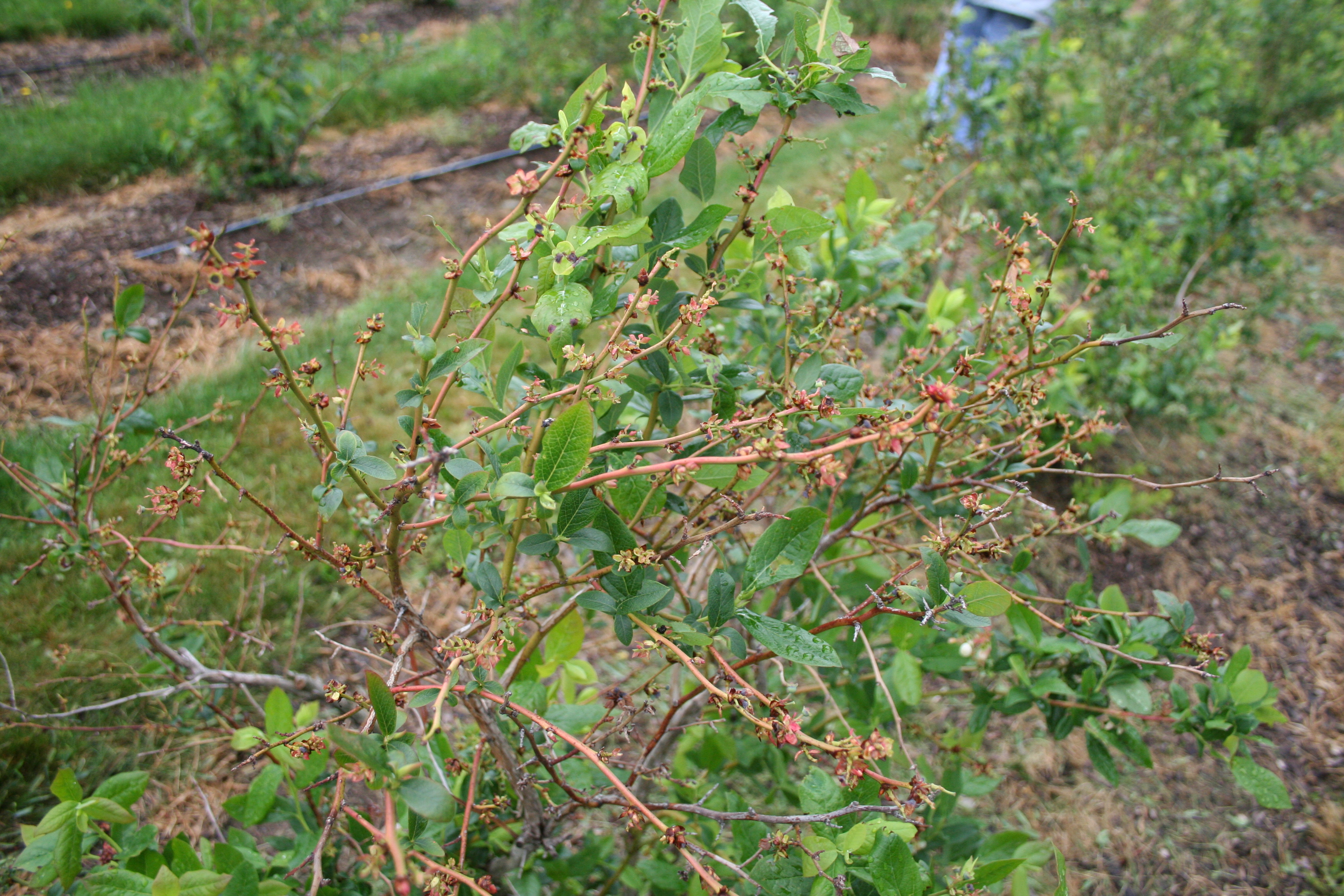
BSIV-3

Since blueberry shock virus is transmitted by pollen and readily dispersed by bees and other pollinators, it is difficult to control. Management strategies for blueberry shock virus are mainly aimed to prevent introduction and transmission of the virus to non-infected plants. A virus test is used to ensure that a nursery stock does not get infected. If plants are suspected to have the virus, based on symptoms, growers are instructed to send in the symptomatic branches to a diagnostic lab for virus testing. ELISA or RT-PCR detects the virus from flower buds early in the season. Growers are instructed to watch for a rapid blight of flowers at bloom that is not caused by a spring freeze. Blueberry shock virus symptoms are identical to blueberry scorch virus, Phomopsis twig blight and Botrytis blossom blight, so test suspicious plants immediately to ensure proper management of the disease. The grower can distinguish between these diseases by the scattered distribution of symptoms and the absence of fungal growth on blighted tissue on plants infected with blueberry shock virus. In addition, blueberry shock virus can be differentiated by its second flush of leaves later in the season.

If a plant is infected, there are two options for management. The first is to allow the virus to run its course. The plant will eventually recover and return to full production. This approach is common in regions where the disease is endemic. The second approach is to remove and burn the plant that is infected, to remove the source of inoculum. This approach is utilized in areas where the virus is not known to be present and if the infection is localized. Once the virus is present in a field, removal of infected plants based on symptoms or diagnostics will slow the spread of the virus but not completely prevent further spread. However, the disease cannot be eliminated just by removing plants that have visual symptoms of the disease. Sometimes a plant or whole field may be infected, but not show symptoms till months or years later. In this case, destruction of the entire field may be necessary in order to remove the virus. Chemical control may be utilized by using herbicides. Herbicides may be applied before the removal of plants to ensure that the root system of the plant will be killed. However, some leftover roots may produce suckers, so it is important to monitor the field for sucker development to ensure that all the disease is gone. If suckers are spotted, they can be killed by repeated cultivation or application of herbicides. Additionally, to reduce the spread and transmission of the virus, growers should not establish new plantings adjacent to infected fields or use planting stock from a field that is in remission.

In addition, there are quarantine laws in some states, like Michigan, that prohibit importing blueberry plant material that have not been tested for the virus. Growers need to buy only virus-tested planting material. Plants should be monitored for symptoms during bloom and suspicious plants should be marked. If there is suspicion, take leaf samples from multiple branches and send them to a diagnostic lab for testing.

== Importance ==
BIShV was first discovered in a blueberry field containing highbush blueberry (Vaccinium corymbosum L.) in Washington in 1991. It continued to spread to Oregon, Washington and British Columbia since that time. By 2009, the disease was found in a western Michigan field, and may be preset in Pennsylvania as of 2011. Since its discovery, eradication is in progress to eliminate the disease and reduce loss of yield from it. The disease is important because it can cause a yield loss of 34-90% as documented by the Pacific Northwest. The magnitude of loss varies annually based on symptom severity and location. The main issue is leaf and foliage necrosis, which slows and neglects photosynthesis and therefore reduces blueberry (yield) quality. After one plant is infected and does survive, that plant becomes a reservoir for the virus for further inoculation to occur via vectors. The pollen-born spreading of the virus allows infection to occur on multiple blueberry patches because vectors can spread the virus extremely rapid and vast. In the Pacific Northwest, good yields are possible after the plant overcomes the initial symptom and damage if the field is well-managed.
