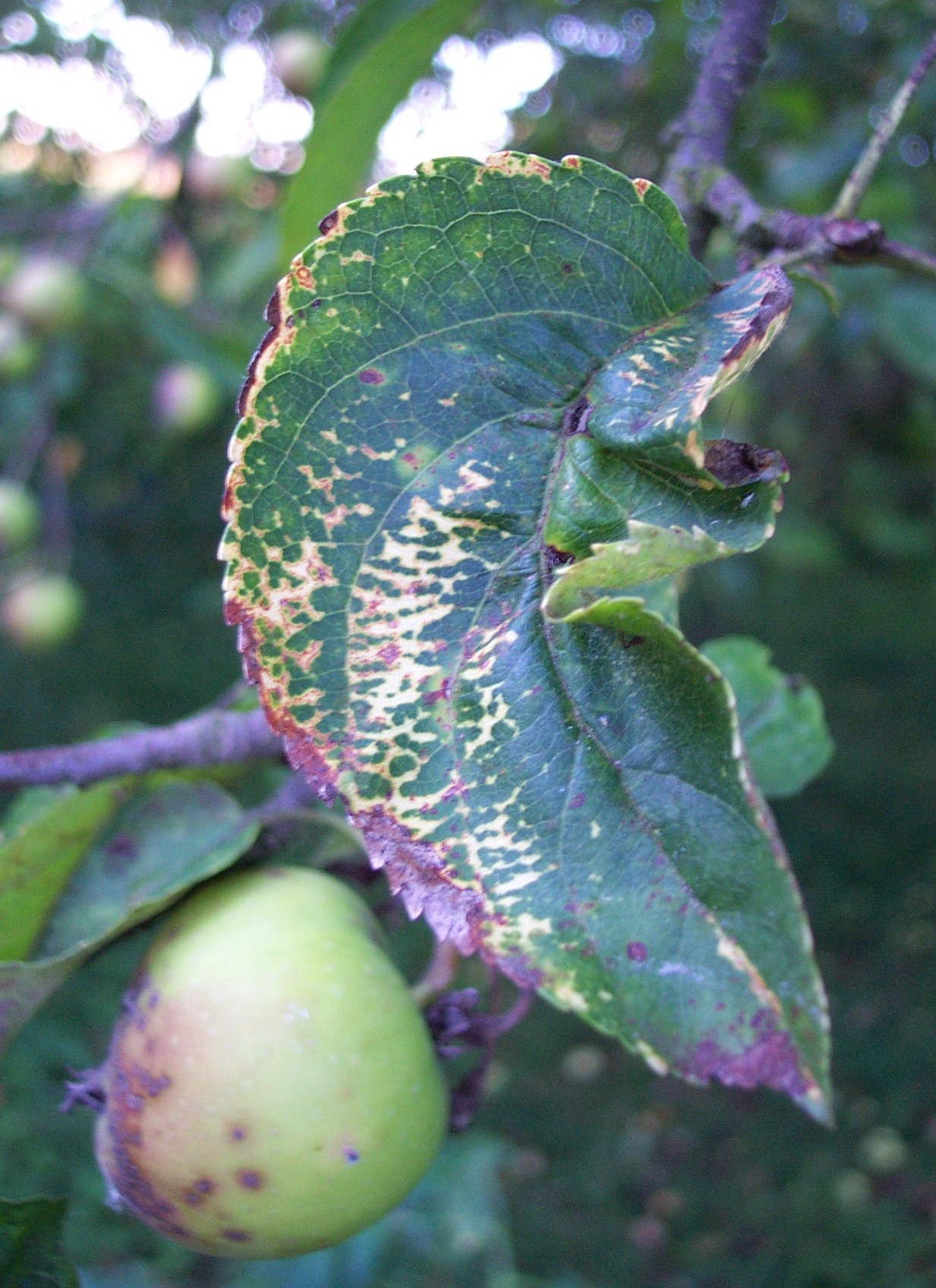
- Apple mosaic virus

Virus classification
- (unranked): Virus
- Realm: Riboviria
- Kingdom: Orthornavirae
- Phylum: Kitrinoviricota
- Class: Alsuviricetes
- Order: Martellivirales
- Family: Bromoviridae
- Genus: Ilarvirus

= Ilarvirus =

Genus of viruses

Ilarvirus is a genus of positive-strand RNA viruses in the family Bromoviridae. Plants serve as natural hosts. There are 36 species in this genus.

== Structure ==
Viruses in the genus Ilarvirus are non-enveloped, with icosahedral and quasi-spherical geometries, and T=3 symmetry. The diameter is around 29 nm. Genomes are linear and have three segments.

== Life cycle ==
Viral replication is cytoplasmic and lysogenic. Entry into the host cell is achieved by penetration into the host cell. Replication follows the positive-strand RNA virus replication model in the cytoplasm. Positive strand RNA virus transcription, using the internal initiation model of subgenomic RNA transcription is the method of transcription. The virus exits the host cell by tubule-guided viral movement. Plants serve as the natural host. Transmission routes are mechanical inoculation by insects and plant to plant contact.

== Taxonomy ==
The following species are assigned to the genus, listed by scientific name and followed by their common names:

- Ilarvirus AGLV, Ageratum latent virus
- Ilarvirus AIV2
- Ilarvirus APLPV, American plum line pattern virus
- Ilarvirus ApMV, Apple mosaic virus
- Ilarvirus ApNMV Apple necrotic mosaic virus
- Ilarvirus AV2, Asparagus virus 2
- Ilarvirus AYRSpV
- Ilarvirus BabIV1, Babaco ilarvirus 1
- Ilarvirus BCRV, Blackberry chlorotic ringspot virus
- Ilarvirus BSV, Blueberry shock virus
- Ilarvirus CarIV1
- Ilarvirus CLRV, Citrus leaf rugose virus
- Ilarvirus CVV, Citrus variegation virus
- Ilarvirus EMoV, Elm mottle virus
- Ilarvirus FCILV, Fragaria chiloensis latent virus
- Ilarvirus HdVBV
- Ilarvirus HJLV, Humulus japonicus latent virus
- Ilarvirus LLCV, Lilac leaf chlorosis virus
- Ilarvirus LRMV, Lilac ring mottle virus
- Ilarvirus PDV, Prune dwarf virus
- Ilarvirus PMV, Parietaria mottle virus
- Ilarvirus PNRSV, Prunus necrotic ringspot virus
- Ilarvirus PrRSV, Privet ringspot virus
- Ilarvirus PrV1
- Ilarvirus RIV1
- Ilarvirus RIV2
- Ilarvirus SLV, Spinach latent virus
- Ilarvirus SnIV1
- Ilarvirus SNSV, Strawberry necrotic shock virus
- Ilarvirus SolV1
- Ilarvirus TAMV, Tulare apple mosaic virus
- Ilarvirus TIV1, Tomato ilarvirus 1
- Ilarvirus TomNSV, Tomato necrotic streak virus
- Ilarvirus ToNSV, Tomato necrotic spot virus
- Ilarvirus TSV, Tobacco streak virus
- Ilarvirus WCVA
