= Anulavirus =

Virus classification
- (unranked): Virus
- Realm: Riboviria
- Kingdom: Orthornavirae
- Phylum: Kitrinoviricota
- Class: Alsuviricetes
- Order: Martellivirales
- Family: Bromoviridae
- Genus: Anulavirus

Genus of viruses

Anulavirus is a genus of viruses, in the family Bromoviridae. Pelargonium serve as natural hosts. There are three species in this genus.

== Taxonomy ==
The following species are assigned to the genus, with their scientific name and common name:

- Anulavirus ALMMV, Amazon lily mild mottle virus
- Anulavirus GLPV, Grapevine line pattern virus
- Anulavirus PZSV, Pelargonium zonate spot virus

== Structure ==
Viruses in the genus Anulavirus have icosahedral and Quasi-spherical geometries, and T=3 symmetry. The diameter is around 25-35 nm. Genomes are linear and segmented, tripartite.

Genus	Structure	Symmetry	Capsid	Genomic arrangement	Genomic segmentation
Anulavirus	Icosahedral	T=3	Non-enveloped	Linear	Segmented

== Life cycle ==
Viral replication is cytoplasmic. Entry into the host cell is achieved by penetration into the host cell. Replication follows the positive stranded RNA virus replication model. Positive stranded rna virus transcription, using the internal initiation model of subgenomic rna transcription is the method of transcription. The virus exits the host cell by tubule-guided viral movement. Pelargonium serve as the natural host. Transmission routes are mechanical.

Genus	Host details	Tissue tropism	Entry details	Release details	Replication site	Assembly site	Transmission
Anulavirus	Plants	None	Viral movement; mechanical inoculation	Viral movement	Cytoplasm	Cytoplasm	Unknown
