= Asparagus virus 2 =

Virus classification
- (unranked): Virus
- Realm: Riboviria
- Kingdom: Orthornavirae
- Phylum: Kitrinoviricota
- Class: Alsuviricetes
- Order: Martellivirales
- Family: Bromoviridae
- Genus: Ilarvirus
- Species: Ilarvirus AV2

Synonyms
- Asparagus virus C Asparagus latent virus

Species of virus

Asparagus virus 2 is a plant pathogenic virus of the family Bromoviridae.
