= Alfalfa mosaic virus RNA 1 5′ UTR stem-loop =

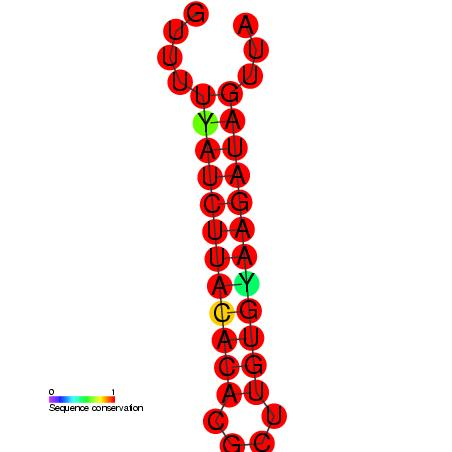
- Predicted secondary structure and sequence conservation of Alfalfa mosaic virus RNA 1 5′ UTR stem-loop

Identifiers
- Symbol: AMV_RNA1_SL
- Rfam: RF00196

Other data
- RNA type: Cis-reg
- Domain(s): Eukaryota; Viruses
- SO: SO:0000204
- PDB structures: PDBe

The Alfalfa mosaic virus RNA 1 5′ UTR stem-loop represents a putative stem-loop structure found in the 5′ UTR in RNA 1 of alfalfa mosaic virus. RNA 1 is responsible for encoding the viral replicase protein P1. This family is required for negative strand RNA synthesis in the alfalfa mosaic virus and may also be involved in positive strand RNA synthesis.

== See also ==
- Alfalfa mosaic virus coat protein binding (CPB) RNA
