= Citrus leaf rugose virus =

Virus classification
- (unranked): Virus
- Realm: Riboviria
- Kingdom: Orthornavirae
- Phylum: Kitrinoviricota
- Class: Alsuviricetes
- Order: Martellivirales
- Family: Bromoviridae
- Genus: Ilarvirus
- Species: Ilarvirus CLRV

Synonyms
- Citrus leaf rugose virus; Citrus psorosis virus complex; Citrus crinkly leaf ilarvirus

Species of virus

Citrus leaf rugose virus (CLRV) is a plant pathogenic virus of the family Bromoviridae. It infects a wide range of valuable citrus hosts (Mexican lime, Eureka lemon, and Duncan grapefruit, for example) and while its specific vector is unknown, it can be mechanically transmitted to non-citrus hosts.
