= Tobacco streak virus =

Virus classification
- (unranked): Virus
- Realm: Riboviria
- Kingdom: Orthornavirae
- Phylum: Kitrinoviricota
- Class: Alsuviricetes
- Order: Martellivirales
- Family: Bromoviridae
- Genus: Ilarvirus
- Species: Ilarvirus TSV

Synonyms
- asparagus stunt virus Datura quercina virus strawberry necrotic shock virus

Species of virus

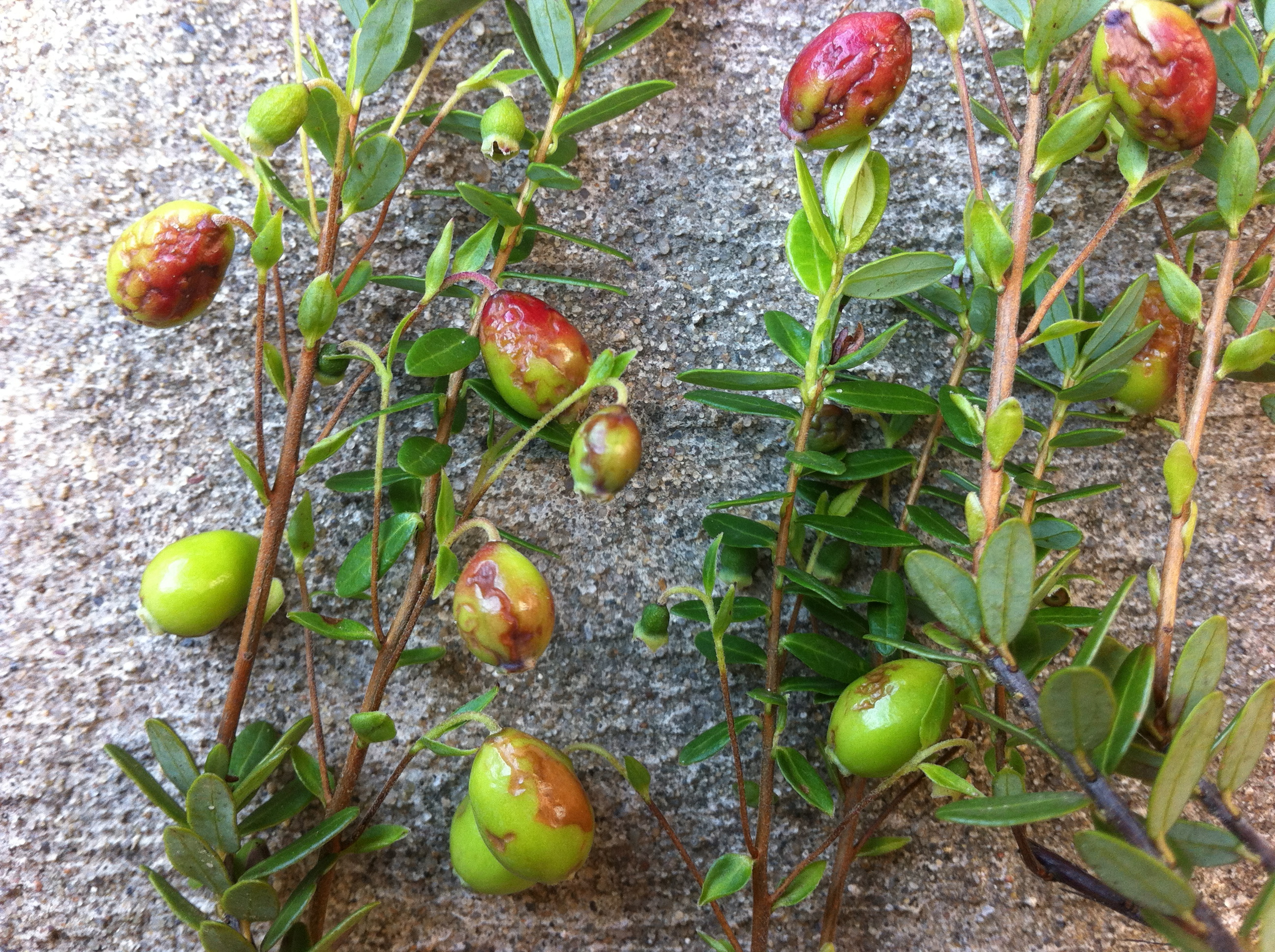
Symptoms of TSV on cranberry.

Tobacco streak virus (TSV) is a plant pathogenic virus of the family Bromoviridae, in the genus Ilarvirus. It has a wide host range, with at least 200 susceptible species. TSV is generally more problematic in the tropics or warmer climates. TSV does not generally lead to epidemics, with the exception of sunflowers in India and Australia, and peanuts in India.

== Host and symptoms ==
TSV has been reported worldwide in North and South America, Europe, India, Japan, Australia, New Zealand and South America. TSV has a wide host range including both monocots and dicots. Economically important crop hosts include peanuts, sunflower, soybean, cranberry, cotton, chickpea and mung beans. As with many plant viruses, diagnosis is very difficult because TSV has very wide host range and has different effects depending on the host being infected. Symptoms of TSV may include black streaks on stems and leaves, stunted growth, chlorosis, leaf mosaic, lodging, and deformed growing tips, to name a few. On tobacco plants, TSV causes chlorosis, with a unique pattern of white or dark necrotic leaf tissue close to the veins of the leaf. As its name implies, necrotic streaks are found on leaf veins of infected plants. Symptoms are strongly influenced by temperature. For example, plants experiencing a temperature of 20 °C will develop small necrotic spots while at temperatures above 30 °C, necrotic spots will become large necrotic arcs. Symptoms are not sufficient to correctly identify TSV - serology and PCR techniques are required.

== Disease cycle ==
TSV purified from infected plants consists of a ss-RNA genome encapsulated by spheroid particles made up of coat protein subunits. The coat protein subunits play a key role in the life cycle of the virus. Once the virus has penetrated into the host cells, it uncoats and releases its viral genomic RNA into the cytoplasm and expressed proteins replicate. After replication, the dsRNA genome is synthesized from genomic ssRNA. Subgenomic RNA4 is translated producing capsid proteins and the new virus particles are assembled. The coat protein of TSV plays an important role in its life cycle. It protects the viral genome and plays a role in cell to cell movement. Once the virus becomes systemic, it can be transmitted by vectors. TSV requires a living plant to survive for a period of time. The virus may be transmitted by thrips vector, mechanical damage, pollen or dodder.

== Environment ==
Severe outbreaks of TSV typically occur under climatic conditions that allow large thrips populations to develop and when large quantities of pollen are being produced by the host plant. These conditions generally occur in warmer months but are dependent on rainfall and weeds in the field.

Modes of Transmission:

- Insect vectors: Several species of thrips serve as vectors of TSV, including Microcephalothrips abdominalis and Thrips tabaci.
- Seed transmission: Seed transmission of TSV is possible depending on the crop.
- Pollen transmission: TSV may be transmitted via pollen, this is also crop dependent.
- Dodder transmission: May be infected via Cuscuta campestris, a parasitic plant often found in agricultural fields..

== Management ==
Control for TSV is difficult, and there are no chemical controls available for the virus. The best management practices are to maintain good sanitation, purchase certified seed, control insects that serve as vectors, and provide barrier crops.

Sanitation: Remove plant debris after harvest or any plant material that may serve as a source of inoculum. Due to its wide host range, TSV may also infect many weed species, so keeping fields free of weeds is a good control strategy.

Chemical Control: Preventative control of disease dispersal may be possible if insecticide is sprayed for the trips vector. Barrier Crops: One common form of management for viruses is to plant a desirable host for thrips around the cropping system. The thrips will insert their stylet and "clean" off any virus on their stylet before moving to the target crop.

Barrier Crops: One common form of management for viruses is to plant a desirable host for thrips around the cropping system. The thrips will insert their stylet and "clean" off any virus on their stylet before moving to the target crop.

== Affected organisms ==
- Asparagus, Asparagus officinalis
- Faba bean, Vicia faba
- Cotton, Gossypium herbaceum
- Sun flower
- Groundnut
- Dahlia
- Cranberry, Vaccinium macrocarpon
- Tomato, Lycopersicon esculentum
- Tobacco, Nicotiana tabacum
- Climbing rose, Rosa setigera
- Common bean, Phaseolus vulgaris
- Soybean, Glycine max
- Red clover, Trifolium pratense
