= Peanut stunt virus =

Virus classification
- (unranked): Virus
- Realm: Riboviria
- Kingdom: Orthornavirae
- Phylum: Kitrinoviricota
- Class: Alsuviricetes
- Order: Martellivirales
- Family: Bromoviridae
- Genus: Cucumovirus
- Species: Cucumovirus PSV

Synonyms
- Robinia mosaic virus; black locust true mosaic virus; clover blotch virus

Species of virus

Peanut stunt virus (PSV) is a plant pathogenic virus in the family Bromoviridae. It is a member of the genus Cucumovirus. The members of this genus are positive-stranded RNA viruses with a multipartite genome (3–4 parts). The virus particles have an isometric or spherical shape.

== Distribution and host range ==
PSV was first named as a new disease of groundnuts or peanuts ( Arachis hypogaea ) in 1966. Disease symptoms on the above ground parts of the peanut plants were described as severe dwarfing or stunting – hence the name Peanut stunt virus. Fruit production was also severely reduced. Virginia peanut fields, where this disease was first observed in 1964, had yield reductions of 10–50%.

Severe stunting of peanuts had also been observed in North Carolina in 1964. The peanut disease in N. Carolina was reported to be caused by the PSV in 1967. The later report also stated that this virus caused disease in bean (Phaseolus vulgaris) and in white clover (Trifolium repens).

After its first description, PSV was quickly diagnosed in beans in Washington State, white clover in South Carolina, peanuts, beans and white clover in Georgia, peanuts in Alabama, and white clover in Florida. Strains of PSV have now been identified in Africa (Morocco), Europe (France, Poland, Russia, and Spain) and Asia (India, Japan, Korea and China) as well as in the United States.

PSV is an economically important pathogen of plants in the family Leguminosae. In addition to beans, peanuts, and clover (7 different species of Trifolium), PSV has been reported to naturally infect peas (Pisum sativum), soybeans (Glycine max), alfalfa (Medicago sativa) and lupine (Lupinus luteus). In 2002, PSV was reported to infect rhizoma or perennial peanut (Arachis glabrata) in N. Florida and S. Georgia.

Host range studies have shown that fourteen other plant families can be infected with this virus including agriculturally important crops in the plant families Cucurbitaceae (squash, cucumber, watermelon) and Solanaceae (tomatoes, peppers, tobacco). Cultivated Tobacco (Nicotiana tabacum) and celery (Apium graveolens) have also been reported to be naturally infected.

== Transmission ==
PSV is transmitted from plant to plant by several species of aphids (Aphis craccivora, A. spiraecola and Myzus persicae) in a stylet-borne manner. It can also be transmitted by mechanical inoculation. It has been shown to be transmitted by seeds in peanuts at a very low level but this is not considered to be very important to the spread of this virus.

The virus can be introduced into a susceptible field crop by aphids from a nearby reservoir (infected perennial hosts like clover, alfalfa or perennial peanuts) and then is spread further into the field by aphids. It can be spread in perennial crops by harvesting (mechanical transmission) and possibly by root grafts.

== Diagnosis ==
Correct diagnosis of any plant disease requires some expertise. Plants suspected of a viral infection should be sent to a plant diagnostic laboratory where the presence or absence of the virus can be confirmed by serological (ELISA), genetic (PCR), or host range tests. Antiserum and sequence data are available for this virus.

== Other references for Peanut stunt virus in perennial peanuts ==
- Blount, A.R., R.K. Sprenkel, R.N. Pittman, B.A. Smith, R.N. Morgan. W. Dankers, and T.M. Momol 2002. Peanut Stunt Virus Reported on Perennial Peanut in North Florida and Southern Georgia. IFAS Pub. SS-AGR-37
- Baker, C. A. Blount and K. Quesenberry 1999. Peanut Stunt Virus Infecting Perennial Peanuts in Florida and Georgia. Division of Plant Industry, Gainesville Fl. Circular 395
- Peanut Stunt Virus in Perennial Peanuts : Symptoms and Inclusions
- "Peanut Stunt Virus (Cucumovirus PSV )". 3 August 2007. IPM images:leaf symptoms of PSV in perennial peanuts
