= Alfalfa mosaic virus coat protein binding (CPB) RNA =

RNA element

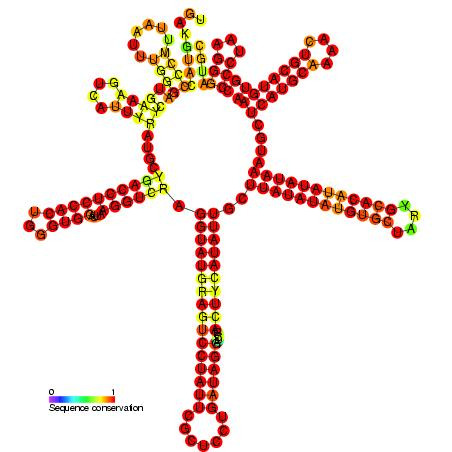
- Predicted secondary structure and sequence conservation of Alfamo_CPB

Identifiers
- Symbol: Alfamo_CPB
- Rfam: RF00252

Other data
- RNA type: Cis-reg
- Domain(s): Viruses
- SO: SO:0000233
- PDB structures: PDBe

The Alfalfa mosaic virus (AMV) coat protein binding (CPB) RNA is an RNA element which is found in the 3′ UTR of the genome. AMV CPB can stimulate the translation of AMV RNA by between 50 and 100-fold. This family contains at least two coat protein binding sites which are thought to be essential for efficient RNA translation.

== See also ==
- Alfalfa mosaic virus RNA 1 5′ UTR stem-loop
