= Groundnut rosette virus =

Virus classification
- (unranked): Virus
- Realm: Riboviria
- Kingdom: Orthornavirae
- Phylum: Kitrinoviricota
- Class: Tolucaviricetes
- Order: Tolivirales
- Family: Tombusviridae
- Genus: Umbravirus
- Species: Umbravirus arachidis

Synonyms
- Groundnut chlorotic rosette virus

Species of virus

Groundnut rosette virus (GRV) is a peanut pathogenic virus found in Sub-Saharan Africa. It is transmitted between plants by insect vectors such as the groundnut aphid (Aphis craccivora).

== History ==
The groundnut (Arachis hypogaea) originated in South America where it has long been domesticated. More recently it has been cultivated in other parts of the world and is an important subsistence crop in Sub-Saharan Africa. Groundnut rosette virus was first described in Africa in 1907 and causes serious damage to groundnut crops on that continent. In 1939 it was reported to infect 80 to 90% of plants in the Belgian Congo causing major losses in yield. The virus can spread rapidly through a crop. In a study in Tanzania, the first affected plants were seen six days after the first aphids were observed. Aphid numbers built up rapidly and the disease increased tenfold in two weeks with 65% of the crop plants affected three weeks later.

== Symptoms ==
Research has shown that plants infected by groundnut rosette virus alone show little or no effect, but that the symptoms of the disease are caused by a satellite RNA co-infection, a subviral agent. Groundnut plants affected take on a bushy appearance due to stunting and distortion of the growing shoots. There is a yellowing or mottling of the foliage. Plants affected when young may produce no nuts.

There are three main types of symptoms:

- Chlorotic rosette is common in many parts of sub-Saharan Africa. Young leaflets become slightly mottled, and older leaflets become chlorotic with green veins. In young plants the leaves become increasingly yellow, twisted and stunted, but in older plants a few branches or just the growing point may be affected.
- Mosaic rosette is prevalent in East and Central Africa. Young leaves have a green and yellow mosaic appearance and later symptoms resemble those of chlorotic rosette but the plants are less severely stunted.
- Green rosette is known from West Africa, northern Malawi, Uganda and possibly Angola. Younger leaves show some mottling and flecking while older leaves are small and very deep green and have inrolled margins. The plants are severely stunted and resemble plants infected with peanut clump virus.

The chlorotic and green types are caused by two variants of the satellite RNA while the mosaic type is caused by infection with a mixture of both variants. Further research has shown that another virus, groundnut rosette assistor virus (GRAV), is also involved in infection. Some groundnut varieties that are resistant to rosette disease have been demonstrated to be highly resistant to GRV and its satellite RNA but fully susceptible to GRAV.

== Transmission ==
The main vector for groundnut rosette virus is the groundnut aphid (Aphis craccivora). When it sucks the sap of an infected plant it receives groundnut rosette virus and satellite RNA, packaged together within a coating of groundnut rosette assistor virus. The disease is epidemic in nature and there is a seasonal cycle of infection, but the origins of this virus are unknown. In Africa, the groundnut aphid feeds on as many as 142 different species of plant, many of them in the family Fabaceae, and the groundnut rosette virus is presumed to have originated among these. Research has shown that although other host plants exist for GRV, GRAV and satellite RNA individually, the only known natural host plant for all parts of the complex is the groundnut.

Virus resistant varieties of groundnut have been discovered but mostly have a long growing period (five to six months rather than three to four for other varieties) and may therefore be more susceptible to drought. A breeding programme has been established in Malawi focusing on disease resistance, early maturity and high yield.
