= Oleavirus =

Virus classification
- (unranked): Virus
- Realm: Riboviria
- Kingdom: Orthornavirae
- Phylum: Kitrinoviricota
- Class: Alsuviricetes
- Order: Martellivirales
- Family: Bromoviridae
- Genus: Oleavirus

Genus of viruses

Oleavirus is a genus of viruses, in the family Bromoviridae. Olive trees serve as natural hosts. There is only one species in this genus: Olive latent virus 2 (Oleavirus OLV2).

== Structure ==
Viruses in the genus Oleavirus are non-enveloped, with icosahedral, Quasi-spherical, and Bacilliform geometries, and T=1 symmetry. The diameter is around 26 nm, with a length of 55 nm and a width of 18 nm. Genomes are linear and segmented, tripartite, around 123kb in length.

Genus	Structure	Symmetry	Capsid	Genomic arrangement	Genomic segmentation
Oleavirus	Icosahedral	T=1	Non-enveloped	Linear	Segmented

== Life cycle ==
Viral replication is cytoplasmic, and is lysogenic. Entry into the host cell is achieved by penetration into the host cell. Replication follows the positive stranded RNA virus replication model. Positive stranded rna virus transcription, using the internal initiation model of subgenomic rna transcription is the method of transcription. The virus exits the host cell by tubule-guided viral movement. Olive tree serve as the natural host. Transmission routes are mechanical and grafting.

Genus	Host details	Tissue tropism	Entry details	Release details	Replication site	Assembly site	Transmission
Oleavirus	Plants	None	Viral movement; mechanical inoculation	Viral movement	Cytoplasm	Cytoplasm	Mechanical inoculation: insects; contact
