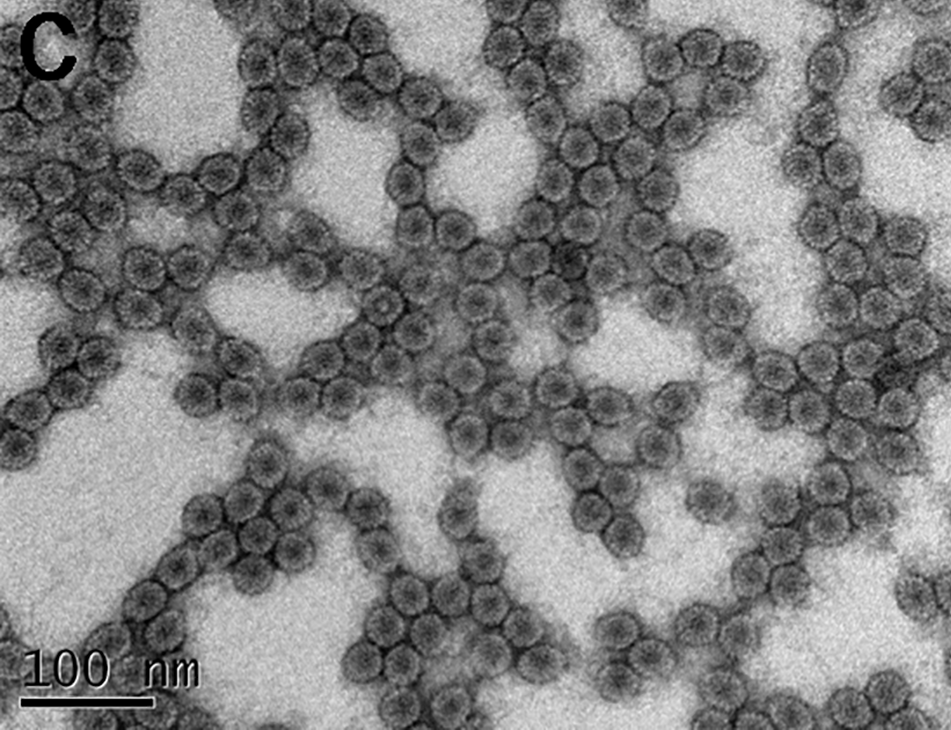
- Transmission electron micrograph of brome mosaic virus (BMV) virions
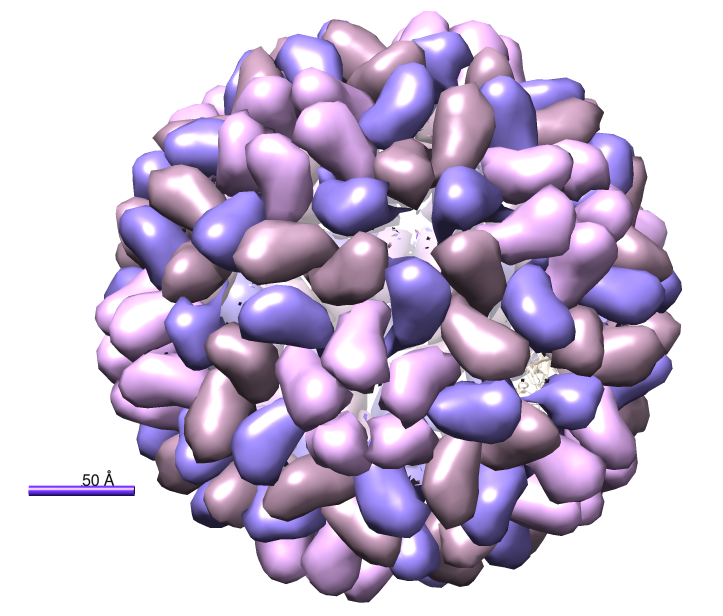
- Crystal structure of Brome mosaic virus, PDB entry 1js9

Virus classification
- (unranked): Virus
- Realm: Riboviria
- Kingdom: Orthornavirae
- Phylum: Kitrinoviricota
- Class: Alsuviricetes
- Order: Martellivirales
- Family: Bromoviridae
- Genus: Bromovirus

Species
- See text

= Bromovirus =

Genus of viruses

Bromovirus is a genus of viruses, in the family Bromoviridae. Plants serve as natural hosts. There are seven species in this genus.

== Taxonomy ==
The following species are assigned to the genus, listed by scientific name and followed by their common names:

- Bromovirus BBMV, Broad bean mottle virus
- Bromovirus BMV, Brome mosaic virus
- Bromovirus CCMV, Cowpea chlorotic mottle virus
- Bromovirus CYBV, Cassia yellow blotch virus
- Bromovirus MYFV, Melandrium yellow fleck virus
- Bromovirus SBLV, Spring beauty latent virus
- Bromovirus SVS, Sambucus virus S

== Structure ==
Viruses in the genus Bromovirus are non-enveloped, with icosahedral geometries, and T=3 symmetry. The diameter is around 26 nm. Genomes are linear and segmented, tripartite.

Genus	Structure	Symmetry	Capsid	Genomic arrangement	Genomic segmentation
Bromovirus	Icosahedral	T=3	Non-enveloped	Linear	Segmented

== Life cycle ==
Viral replication is cytoplasmic. Entry into the host cell is achieved by penetration into the host cell. Replication follows the positive stranded RNA virus replication model. Positive stranded rna virus transcription, using the internal initiation model of subgenomic RNA transcription is the method of transcription. The virus exits the host cell by tubule-guided viral movement. Plants serve as the natural host. Transmission routes are mechanical and contact.

Genus	Host details	Tissue tropism	Entry details	Release details	Replication site	Assembly site	Transmission
Bromovirus	Plants	None	Viral movement; mechanical inoculation	Viral movement	Cytoplasm	Cytoplasm	Mechanical inoculation: insects; contact

=== Recombination ===
Brome mosaic virus (BMV) genomes are able to undergo RNA-RNA homologous recombination upon infection of plant cells. The RNA-dependent RNA polymerase specified by the BMV genome appears to undergo template switching (copy choice) recombination during viral RNA synthesis.
