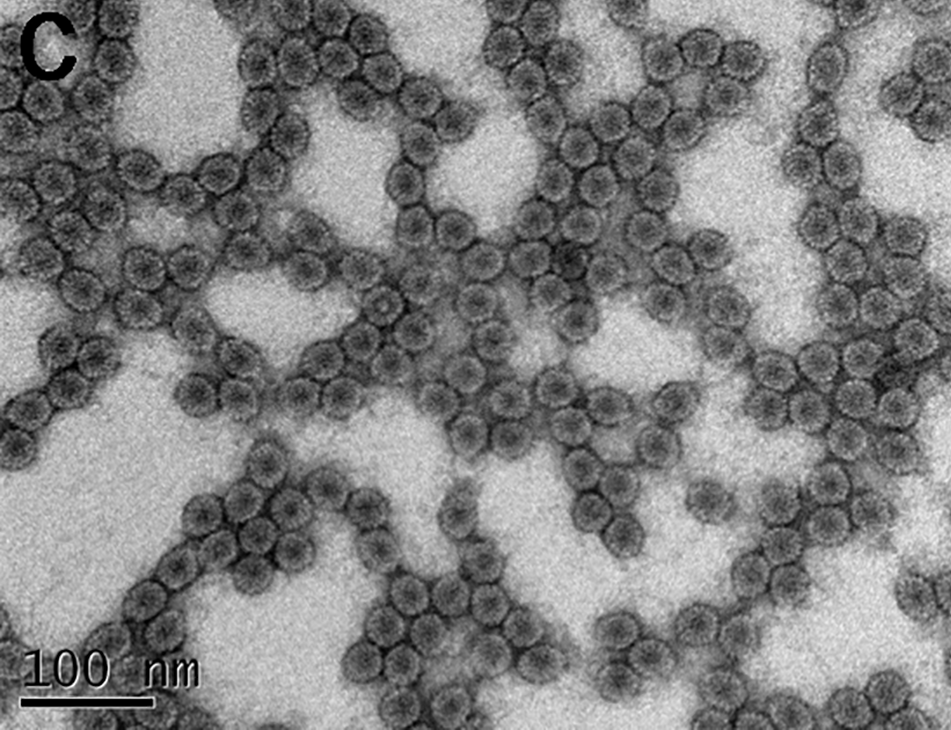
- Transmission electron micrograph of brome mosaic virus virions
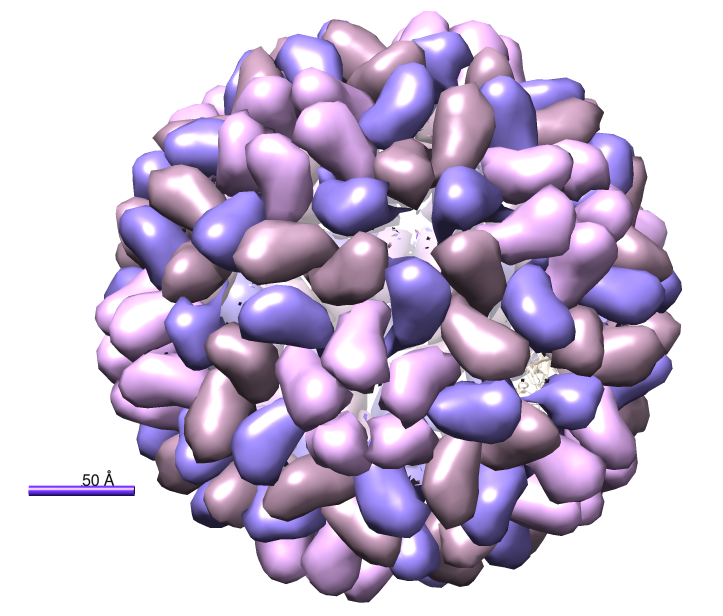
- Crystal structure of Brome mosaic virus, PDB entry 1js9

Virus classification
- (unranked): Virus
- Realm: Riboviria
- Kingdom: Orthornavirae
- Phylum: Kitrinoviricota
- Class: Alsuviricetes
- Order: Martellivirales
- Family: Bromoviridae
- Genus: Bromovirus
- Species: Bromovirus

= Brome mosaic virus =

Species of virus

Brome mosaic virus (BMV) is a small (28 nm, 86S), positive-stranded, icosahedral RNA plant virus belonging to the genus Bromovirus, family Bromoviridae, in the Alphavirus-like superfamily.

Brome mosaic virus was first isolated in 1942 from bromegrass (Bromus inermis). had its genomic organization determined by the 1970s, and was completely sequenced with commercially available clones by the 1980s.

The alphavirus-like superfamily includes more than 250 plant and animal viruses including Tobacco mosaic virus, Semliki forest virus, Hepatitis E virus, Sindbis virus, and arboviruses (which cause certain types of encephalitis). Many of the positive-strand RNA viruses that belong to the alphavirus family share a high degree of similarity in proteins involved in genomic replication and synthesis. The sequence similarities of RNA replication genes and strategies for brome mosaic virus have been shown to extend to a wide range of plant and animal viruses beyond the alphaviruses, including many other positive-strand RNA viruses from other families. Understanding how these viruses replicate and targeting key points in their life cycle can help advance antiviral treatments worldwide.

== Genome ==
Brome mosaic virus has a genome that is divided into three 5' capped RNAs. RNA1 (3.2 kb) encodes a protein called 1a (109 kDa), which contains both an N-proximal methyltransferase domain and a C-proximal helicase-like domain. The methyltransferase domain shows sequence similarity to other alphavirus m7G methyltransferases and guanyltransferases, called nsP1 proteins, involved in RNA capping. RNA2 (2.9 kb) encodes the 2a protein (94 kDa), the RNA-dependent RNA polymerase, responsible for replication of the viral genome. The dicistronic RNA3 (2.1 kb) encodes for two proteins, the 3a protein (involved in cell-to-cell migration during infection) and the coat protein (for RNA encapsidation and vascular spread), which is expressed from a subgenomic replication intermediate mRNA, called RNA4 (0.9 kb). 3a and coat protein are essential for systemic infection in plants but not RNA replication.

== Hosts and symptoms ==
Brome mosaic virus commonly infects Bromus inermis (see Bromus) and other grasses, can be found almost anywhere wheat is grown. It is also one of the few grass viruses that infects dicotyledonous plants, such as soybean; however, it primarily infects monocotyledonous plants, such as barley and others in the family Gramineae. The diagnostic species of this disease is maize, where seedlings show a variety of symptoms of this diseases. Its propagation species is barley, which displays a mild mosaic. The assay species of this disease is Chenopodium Hybridum. The symptoms of brome mosaic virus infection are similar to those of most mosaic viruses. The symptoms consist of stunted growth, lesions, mosaic leaves, and death. These symptoms generally appear around 10 days after germination of the host plant. The symptoms of this disease affect maize and barley plants the most.

In 2015, it was found that brome mosaic virus had coinfected triticale with wheat streak mosaic virus. This was the first report of coinfection between those two viruses and raises and the first report of brome mosaic virus infecting triticale. This raises questions on whether or not the two viruses share a common vector and how they interact with each other. They are currently researching further into this occurrence.

== Management ==
Currently, there is no treatment for this virus once the plant has been infected, only preventative measures. One option is to use a strain of plant that is resistant to this virus. As this is a virus, fungicides will have no effect on the spread or infection of this disease. It is important to remove all perennial weeds in the area and to use insecticide to help kill vectors of this disease. and to thoroughly clean equipment and hands before contact with plants. The removal of any infected plants protects the health of surrounding plants by stopping the spread of the disease. There are currently no biological control methods to combat this virus. It has been found that the most effective way to combat this virus is to use strains of crop that have resistance to this virus and to use pesticides to remove any vectors that could carry this disease because one of the number one causes of this disease vectors transmitting it to multiple plants after taking up the virus.

== Environment and importance ==
Environments that are most suitable for this disease are generally damp because viruses are transmitted easier when the plants are wet. It is also found in areas that have a heavy amount of wheat plants present and where there is a lot of human contact or exposure Humans are one of the most common vectors used to spread this disease. The temperature range at which this disease is most infective at 20 °C to 36 °C, according to “Plant Viruses” on page 417. There are multiple vectors for this virus. The vector that is most associated with this disease is the Oulema melanopus L. beetle. This beetle is found over a large portion of the Midwest and is one of the biggest carriers of this pathogen. The importance of this disease is it can severely reduce yield of the host plants and the fact it has a wide variety of host plants that it infects. In as study performed in Ohio, they found that brome mosaic virus can reduce yield by as much as 61% in soft red winter wheat. The findings found in the Ohio study suggest that Brome Mosaic Virus might have a greater impact on wheat production than previously thought. Farmers have to take great measures to prevent and contain this virus in order to ensure that they produce a quality crop with maximum yield.
