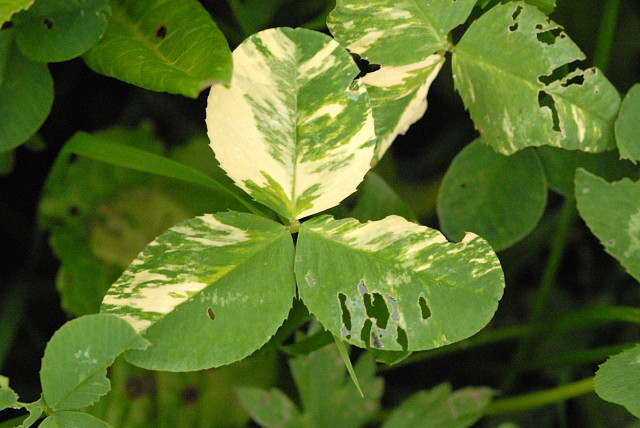
- Alfalfa mosaic virus on clover

Virus classification
- (unranked): Virus
- Realm: Riboviria
- Kingdom: Orthornavirae
- Phylum: Kitrinoviricota
- Class: Alsuviricetes
- Order: Martellivirales
- Family: Bromoviridae
- Genus: Alfamovirus
- Species: Alfamovirus AMV

= Alfalfa mosaic virus =

Species of virus

Alfalfa mosaic virus (AMV), also known as Lucerne mosaic virus or Potato calico virus, is a worldwide distributed phytopathogen that can lead to necrosis and yellow mosaics on a large variety of plant species, including commercially important crops. It is the only species in the Alfamovirus genus of the family Bromoviridae. In 1931 Weimer J.L. was the first to report AMV in alfalfa (Medicago sativa). Transmission of the virus occurs mainly by some aphids (plant lice), by seeds or by pollen to the seed.

== Virology ==
=== Structure ===
The virion has a capsid (coat protein) but no envelope. The icosahedral symmetry of the capsid is round to elongated. The range for the length of the virion particle is about 30–57 nm. AMV is a multipartite virus and is composed of four particles (three bacilliform and one spheroidal) with a diameter of 18 nm.

=== Genome ===
The genetic material of AMV consists of three linear positive-sense strand RNAs (RNA 1, RNA 2 and RNA 3) and a subgenomic RNA (RNA 4) which is obtained by transcription of the negative-sense strand of RNA 3. RNA 1 and 2 encode proteins needed for replication. RNA 3 is required for the synthesis of the protein responsible for cell-to-cell movement. RNA 4 encodes the capsid.

Beside encapsidation and its role in movement, the viral coat protein plays a role in the initiation of RNA replication. This property is called genome activation and means that the genomic nucleic acid is not infectious without the capsid. Specific association of the coat protein with the RNA 3’- terminal sequences or with the subgenomic mRNA is required for the infection.

Bacilliform particles contain separately encapsidated RNAs 1, 2 and 3. Spheroidal particles each have two copies of RNA 4. The nucleotide sequence of the complete genome has been determined and the length of the genome is 8274 nucleotides (or 9155 including the subgenomic RNA). RNA 1, 2, 3 and 4 are respectively 3644 (3.65kb), 2593 (2.6kb), 2037 (2.2kb) and 881 (0.88kb) nucleotides long.

=== Replication cycle ===
The AMV cycle can be split up into five steps:

- 1st step: AMV enters the cell and the particles disassemble. The capsid protein remains attached to the coat protein binding site (CPB) at the 3’- end of the RNAs. The initiation factors elF4A, elF4E and elF4G of the host bind to the cap (5’-end).
- 2nd step: The coat protein interacts with an initiation factor. This triggers translation of RNA1 and 2 into replicase proteins P1 and P2. The complex P1/P2 binds to the RNA.
- 3rd step: Targeting of RNA to the tonoplast by P1/P2. The capsid dissociates from CPB. CPB undergoes a conformational change into TLS (tRNA-like structure). P1/P2 bind to the minus- strand promoter which is made up of TLS and hairpin E (directs initiation of some transcriptions).
- 4th step: Minus- strand RNAs are synthesized.
- 5th step: Plus- strand RNAs and viral proteins are synthesized. Virions assemble.

(Most details of the replication cycle are still unknown).

== Pathology ==
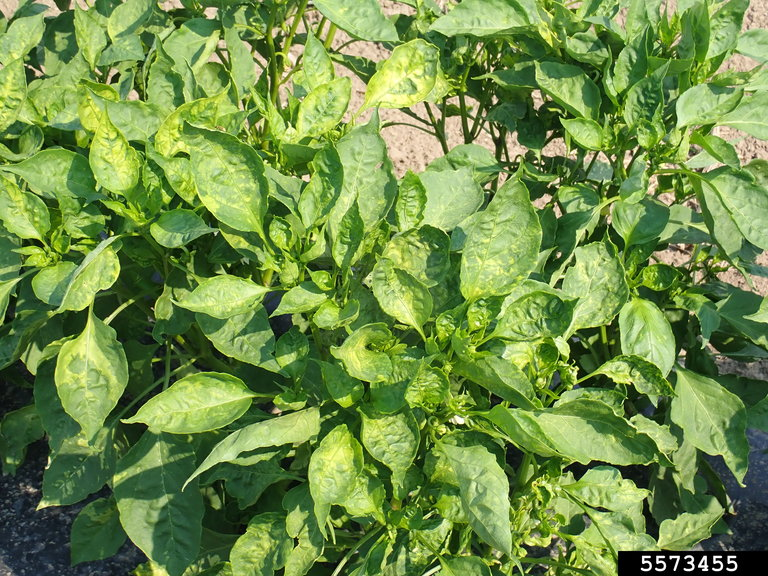
Symptoms of alfalfa mosaic virus on chili peppers (Capsicum annuum)

AMV infects over 600 plant species in 70 families (experimental and natural hosts). Some hosts: potato (Solanum tuberosum), pea (Pisum sativum), tobacco (Nicotiana tabacum), tomato (Lycopersicon esculentum), and bluebeard (Caryopteris incana).

Symptoms vary from wilting, white flecks, malformation like dwarfing, ringspots, mottles, mosaics to necrosis depending on the virus strain, host variety, stage of growth at infection and environmental conditions. Signs of infection can persist or disappear quickly. The virus can be detected in each part of the host plant. The virions are mainly found in the cytoplasm of the infected plant (as inclusion bodies; Inclusions of Alfalfa mosaic virus).

In vitro AMV has a longevity of 1–4 days (sometimes much longer). Temperature and light are the environmental factors that have the greatest influence on the multiplication and movement of AMV in the plant and thus indirectly on the symptoms. Under low temperature the appearance of necrosis for example is less than that for high temperature. The virus usually reaches his inactivation temperature at 60–65 °C. Dark conditions slow down the virus multiplication, while light speeds it up. A hypothesis for this phenomenon is that shading causes a decrease in ATP production by photosynthesis. The optimum pH was found to be about pH 7–7.5 for AMV in sap (depending on the host species). It has been proved that in the important forage grass alfalfa, the infection by AMV leads to a decrease of Cu, Fe, Mn, P and Zn quantities. On the other hand, an increase in N (viral protein) was observed. Infected alfalfa was also not seen to be harmful for domestic animals.

AMV is a very variable plant virus and several strains with minor differences exist (strain Q, strain S, strain 425, strain AlMV-B, strain AlMV-S). Distinction is based on different symptoms in one or two chosen hosts and also on, for example, differential physico-chemical properties.

== Transmission ==
The vectors are insects of the order Hemiptera, family Aphididae; green peach aphids (Myzus persicae) and at least 14 other species are known to play that role. AMV can also be transmitted by seed, pollen, through mechanical inoculation of plant sap and by the parasitic plant dodder (Cuscuta). The combination of seed-infected plants and spreading by aphids results mostly in high levels of infection.

== Economic importance ==
The host range of the virus is wide and includes food and pasture crops (peas, lentils, potatoes, clovers). Infection by AMV causes important yield losses, reduces winter survival and facilitates infection of the affected plant by other pathogens.

== Management ==
Insecticides against aphids are not effective for controlling AMV. Recommendations are sowing healthy seed (some seed companies sell seed tested for AMV), managing weeds, avoiding growing crops adjacent to infected pasture and other cultural practices to minimize AMV. Work has been done on creating transgenic AMV resistant plants. For example, DNA derived from AMV encoding the gene for the capsid has been inserted into alfalfa plants. This reduced the susceptibility of the plants to infection by AMV and the plants would be less of a reservoir of virus for spread to other plants.

== See also ==
- Alfalfa mosaic virus coat protein binding (CPB) RNA
- Alfalfa mosaic virus RNA 1 5′ UTR stem-loop
- Viral diseases of potato
