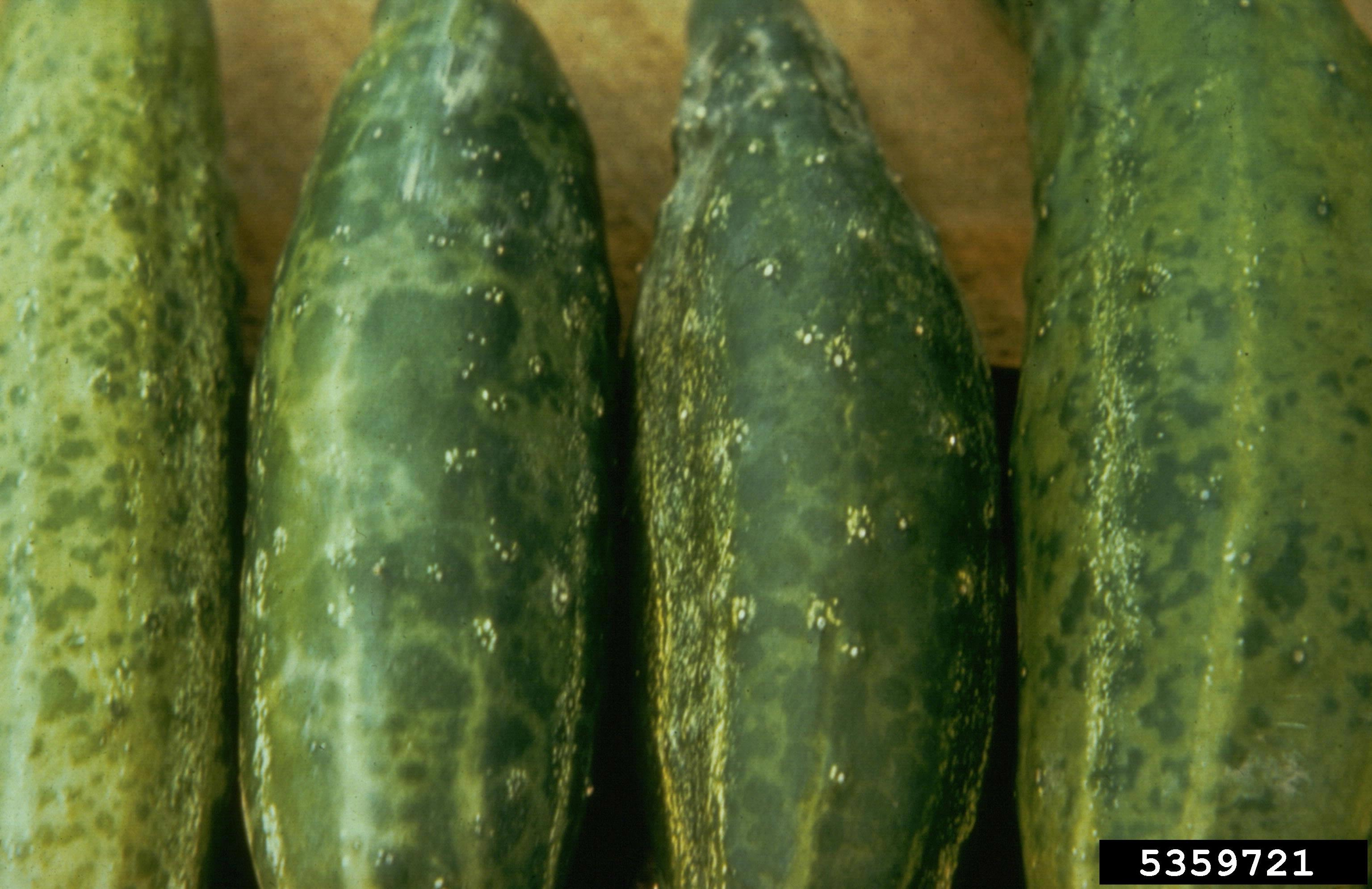
- Cucumber mosaic virus symptoms

Virus classification
- (unranked): Virus
- Realm: Riboviria
- Kingdom: Orthornavirae
- Phylum: Kitrinoviricota
- Class: Alsuviricetes
- Order: Martellivirales
- Family: Bromoviridae
- Genus: Cucumovirus

Species
- See text

= Cucumovirus =

Genus of viruses

Cucumovirus is a genus of viruses, in the family Bromoviridae. Plants serve as natural hosts. There are four species in this genus.

== Taxonomy ==
The following species are assigned to the genus, listed by scientific name and followed by their common names:

- Cucumovirus CMV, Cucumber mosaic virus
- Cucumovirus GMMV, Gayfeather mild mottle virus
- Cucumovirus PSV, Peanut stunt virus
- Cucumovirus TAV, Tomato aspermy virus

== Structure ==
Viruses in the genus Cucumovirus are non-enveloped, with icosahedral and Spherical geometries, and T=3 symmetry. The diameter is around 29 nm. Genomes are linear and segmented, tripartite.

Genus	Structure	Symmetry	Capsid	Genomic arrangement	Genomic segmentation
Cucumovirus	Icosahedral	T=3	Non-enveloped	Linear	Segmented

== Life cycle ==
Viral replication is cytoplasmic. Entry into the host cell is achieved by penetration into the host cell. Replication follows the positive stranded RNA virus replication model. Positive stranded rna virus transcription, using the internal initiation model of subgenomic rna transcription is the method of transcription. The virus exits the host cell by tubule-guided viral movement. Plants serve as the natural host. Transmission routes are mechanical and contact.

Genus	Host details	Tissue tropism	Entry details	Release details	Replication site	Assembly site	Transmission
Cucumovirus	Plants	None	Viral movement; mechanical inoculation	Viral movement	Cytoplasm	Cytoplasm	Mechanical inoculation: insects; contact

== Epidemiology ==
It is thought that cucumoviruses are present worldwide, being known to occur in Eurasia, Australia, Canada, France, India, Japan, North and South Korea, Morocco, New Zealand, Poland, Spain, the US, and the former USSR. Its natural hosts belong to the domain Eukaryota. The virus is transmitted by vector, mechanical inoculation, grafting, or seeds, and it is transmitted in a non-persistent manner. The vectors may be arthropods, specifically insects of the order Hemiptera, family Aphididae (colloquially one would say cucumovirus is transmitted by aphids).
