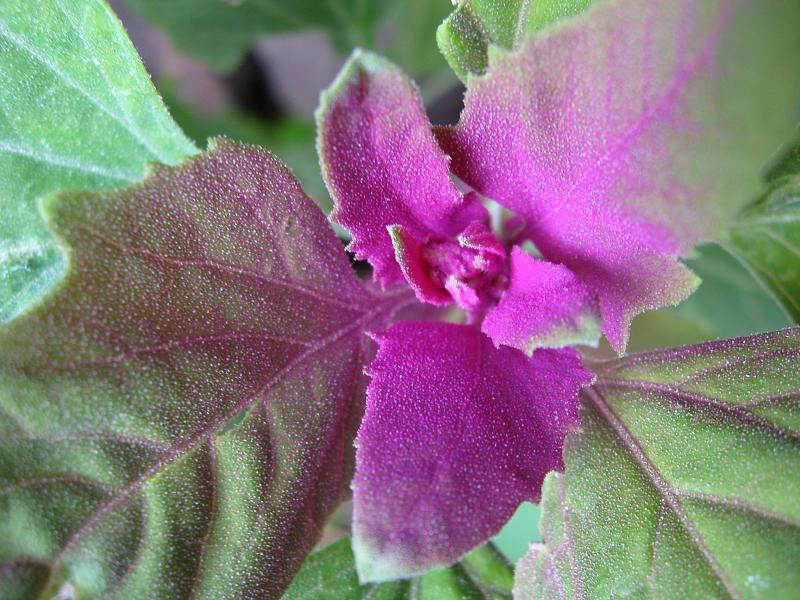
- Close-up of Chenopodium giganteum

Scientific classification
- Kingdom: Plantae
- Clade: Tracheophytes
- Clade: Angiosperms
- Clade: Eudicots
- Order: Caryophyllales
- Family: Amaranthaceae
- Genus: Chenopodium
- Species: C. giganteum

Binomial name
- Chenopodium giganteum D.Don

Synonyms
- Atriplex bengalensis Lam.; Chenopodium amaranticolor (H.J.Coste & A.Reyn.) H.J.Coste & A.Reyn.; Chenopodium bengalense (Lam.) Spielm. ex Steud.; Chenopodium centrorubrum (Makino) Nakai; Chenopodium elegantissimum Koidz.; Chenopodium formosanum Koidz.; Chenopodium hookerianum Moq.; Chenopodium mairei H.Lév.; Chenopodium rubricaule Schrad. ex Moq.

= Chenopodium giganteum =

Species of flowering plant

Chenopodium giganteum, also known as tree spinach, is an annual, upright many-branched forb with a stem diameter of up to 5 cm at the base, that can grow to a height of up to 3 m.

== Description ==
The younger leaves of Chenopodium giganteum are hairy with a magenta colour and the older become green. The rhombic to ovate formed lamina can have a surface of up to 20 x 16 cm. The inflorescence consists of terminal panicles with hermaphrodite flowers, which are wind pollinated. The flowers contain 5 perianth leaves and 5 stamens. The flowering period begins in August. The seeds have a diameter of 1.5 mm. The number of chromosomes is n=54.

== Habitat and distribution ==
Chenopodium giganteum belongs to the same genus as quinoa or Chenopodium album. Many species of this genus have a long history of domestications as grain, vegetable or forage crops. Therefore, genetic relationships and place of origin are hard to determine. Chenopodium giganteum has two main subspecies: one originating from India the other from America.

It grows well in Mediterranean environment but needs full or partial shade. Chenopodium giganteum does not have high requirements on soil quality. Furthermore, it shows weedy characteristics such as fast growth and rapid spreading. In a few countries, such as Germany and Slovakia, Chenopodium giganteum has been reported as a neophyte. The commercial cultivation of Chenopodium giganteum is nearly inexistent. But because of its stable and high yield Chenopodium giganteum could be a plant of the future.

== Use ==
The young shoots and leaves of Chenopodium giganteum can be eaten cooked like spinach, another member of the Amaranthaceae. Most of the oxalic acid and saponins are removed during the cooking process, especially if boiled for 2 minutes at 100 °C (212 °F). However, the leaves are also edible raw in lower quantities, for example as a salad. The seeds can be prepared similar to rice or quinoa or can alternatively be ground into flour, which is then mixed with cereal flour for bread making.

Due to the partially pink coloured leaves, Chenopodium giganteum also has an ornamental value.

== Nutrition ==
As common for species of the family Amaranthaceae, the plants contain some amounts of saponins and oxalic acid, which in high concentrations can have negative health impacts on humans (e.g. Hemolysis or Kidney stone disease).
