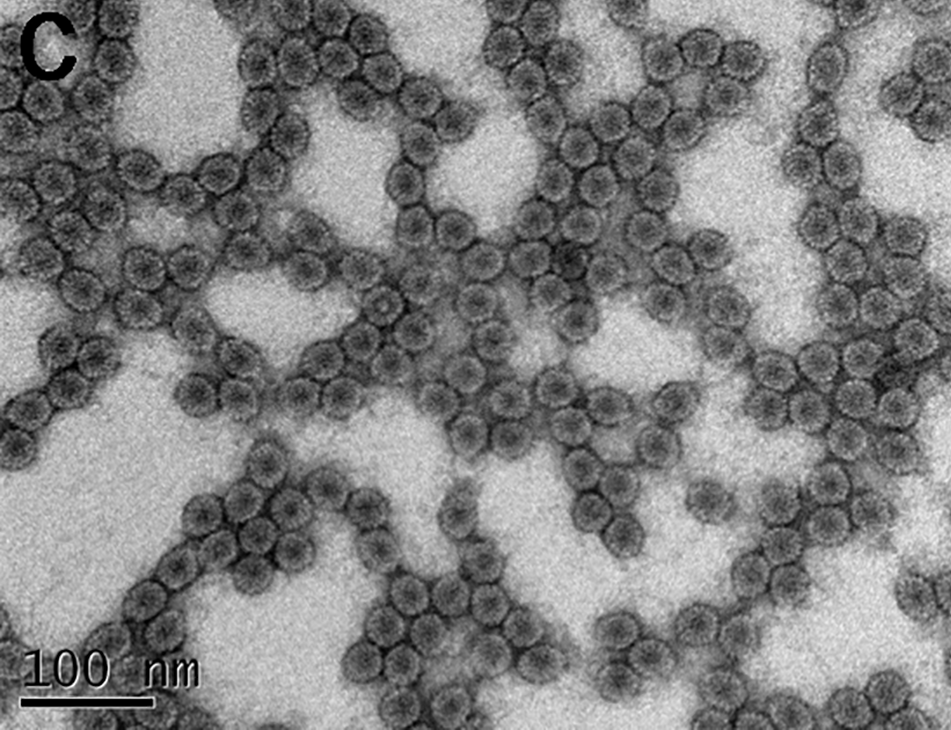
- Transmission electron micrograph of brome mosaic virus (BMV) virions
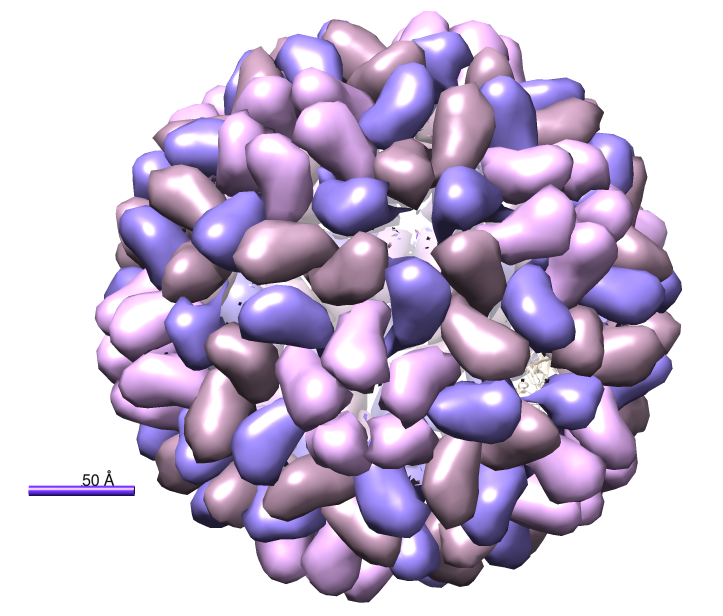
- Crystal structure of Brome mosaic virus, PDB entry 1js9

Virus classification
- (unranked): Virus
- Realm: Riboviria
- Kingdom: Orthornavirae
- Phylum: Kitrinoviricota
- Class: Alsuviricetes
- Order: Martellivirales
- Family: Bromoviridae

Genera
- Alfamovirus; Anulavirus; Bromovirus; Cucumovirus; Ilarvirus; Oleavirus

= Bromoviridae =

Family of viruses

Bromoviridae is a family of viruses. Plants serve as natural hosts. There are six genera in the family.

== Taxonomy ==
The following genera are assigned to the family:

- Alfamovirus
- Anulavirus
- Bromovirus
- Cucumovirus
- Ilarvirus
- Oleavirus

== Structure ==
Viruses in the family Bromoviridae are non-enveloped, with icosahedral and bacilliform geometries. The diameter is around 26-35 nm.

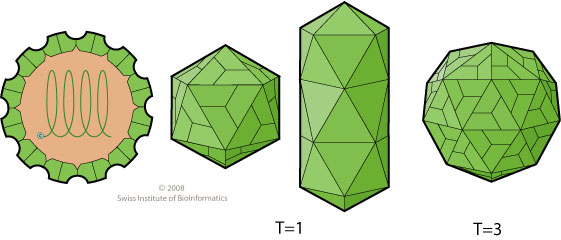
Several different types of virion to be found in family Bromoviridae

Genus	Structure	Symmetry	Capsid	Genomic arrangement	Genomic segmentation
Ilarvirus	Icosahedral	T=3	Non-enveloped	Linear	Segmented
Anulavirus	Icosahedral	T=3	Non-enveloped	Linear	Segmented
Bromovirus	Icosahedral	T=3	Non-enveloped	Linear	Segmented
Oleavirus	Icosahedral	T=1	Non-enveloped	Linear	Segmented
Alfamovirus	Varies		Non-enveloped	Linear	Segmented
Cucumovirus	Icosahedral	T=3	Non-enveloped	Linear	Segmented

Genomes are linear and segmented, tripartite.

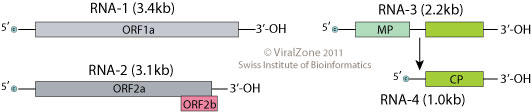
Bromoviridae genome map

== Life cycle ==
Viral replication is cytoplasmic, and is lysogenic. Entry into the host cell is achieved by penetration into the host cell. Replication follows the positive stranded RNA virus replication model. Positive stranded rna virus transcription, using the internal initiation model of subgenomic rna transcription is the method of transcription. The virus exits the host cell by tubule-guided viral movement. Plants serve as the natural host. Transmission routes are mechanical and contact.

Genus	Host details	Tissue tropism	Entry details	Release details	Replication site	Assembly site	Transmission
Ilarvirus	Plants	None	Viral movement; mechanical inoculation	Viral movement	Cytoplasm	Cytoplasm	Mechanical inoculation: insects; contact
Anulavirus	Plants	None	Viral movement; mechanical inoculation	Viral movement	Cytoplasm	Cytoplasm	Unknown
Bromovirus	Plants	None	Viral movement; mechanical inoculation	Viral movement	Cytoplasm	Cytoplasm	Mechanical inoculation: insects; contact
Oleavirus	Plants	None	Viral movement; mechanical inoculation	Viral movement	Cytoplasm	Cytoplasm	Mechanical inoculation: insects; contact
Alfamovirus	Plants	None	Viral movement; mechanical inoculation	Viral movement	Cytoplasm	Cytoplasm	Mechanical inoculation: insects
Cucumovirus	Plants	None	Viral movement; mechanical inoculation	Viral movement	Cytoplasm	Cytoplasm	Mechanical inoculation: insects; contact
