= List of beet diseases =

This article is a list of diseases of beets (Beta vulgaris), a plant grown for its edible taproot and leaves.

== Bacterial diseases ==
Bacterial diseases
Bacterial blight	Pseudomonas syringae pv. aptata
Bacterial pocket	Xanthomonas beticola
Bacterial soft rot	Erwinia carotovora subsp. carotovora
Bacterial vascular necrosis and rot	Erwinia carotovora subsp. betavasculorum
Crown gall	Agrobacterium tumefaciens
Silvering disease	Curtobacterium flaccumfaciens pv. betae = Corynebacterium betae

== Fungal diseases ==
Fungal diseases
Alternaria leaf spot	Alternaria alternata Alternaria brassicae
Anthracnose	Colletotrichum dematium
Aphanomyces root rot (black root)	Aphanomyces cochlioides
Black wood vessel	Pythium irregulare
Cercospora leaf spot	Cercospora beticola
Charcoal rot	Macrophomina phaseolina
Choanephora rot	Choanephora cucurbitarum
Damping-off, black leg, black root and seedling blight	Aphanomyces cochlioides Cylindrocladium spp. Fusarium spp. Phoma betae Pleospora betae [teleomorph] Pythium spp. Rhizoctonia solani Thanatephorus cucumeris [teleomorph]
Downy mildew	Peronospora farinosa Peronospora farinosa f.sp. betae = Peronospora schachtii
Fusarium yellows	Fusarium oxysporum
Fusarium yellows and root rot	Fusarium oxysporum f.sp. betae (Texas isolates)
Leaf gall (beet tumor, or crown wart)	Physoderma leproides = Urophlyctis leproides
Phoma leaf spot and root rot	Phoma betae
Phymatotrichum root rot (cotton root rot)	Phymatotrichopsis omnivora = Phymatotrichum omnivorum
Phytophthora wet rot	Phytophthora drechsleri
Powdery mildew	Erysiphe polygoni = Erysiphe betae
Pythium root rot	Pythium aphanidermatum Pythium deliense
Ramularia leaf spot	Ramularia beticola
Rhizoctonia foliar blight, crown and root rot	Rhizoctonia solani
Rhizopus root rot	Rhizopus arrhizus Rhizopus stolonifer
Rust	Uromyces betae
Sclerotinia crown & root rot	Sclerotinia sclerotiorum
Seedling rust	Puccinia subnitens
Slime molds	Physarum cinereum
Southern blight (Sclerotium root rot and stem rot)	Sclerotium rolfsii Athelia rolfsii [teleomorph]
Stemphylium leaf spot	Stemphylium botryosum Pleospora tarda [teleomorph]
Storage rots	Botrytis cinerea Botryotinia fuckeliana [teleomorph] Penicillium spp. Phoma betae
Verticillium wilt	Verticillium albo-atrum
Violet root rot	Helicobasidium brebissonii Rhizoctonia crocorum [anamorph]

== Nematodes, parasitic ==
Nematodes, parasitic
Beet cyst nematode	Heterodera schachtii
Clover cyst nematode	Heterodera trifolii
False root-knot nematode	Nacobbus aberrans
Lesion nematodes	Pratylenchus spp.
Needle nematodes	Longidorus spp.
Potato rot nematode	Ditylenchus destructor
Root-knot	Meloidogyne spp.
Stem and bulb nematode	Ditylenchus dipsaci
Stubby-root nematodes	Paratrichodorus spp. Trichodorus spp.

== Viral diseases ==
Viral diseases
Alfalfa mosaic	genus Alfamovirus, Alfalfa mosaic virus (AMV)
Beet curly top	genus Hybrigeminivirus, Beet curly top virus (BCTV)
Beet distortion mosaic	genus ?, Beet distortion mosaic virus
Beet leaf curl	genus Rhabdovirus, Beet leaf curl virus (BCLV)
Beet mild yellows & Beet western yellows	genus Luteovirus, Beet western yellows virus (BMY)
Beet mosaic	genus Potyvirus, Beet mosaic virus (BtMV)
Beet yellow net	genus Luteovirus, Beet yellow net virus (BYNV)
Beet yellows	genus Closterovirus, Beet yellows virus (BYV)
Cucumber mosaic	genus Cucumovirus, Cucumber mosaic virus (CMV)
Lettuce infectious yellows	genus Closterovirus, Lettuce infectious yellows virus (LIYV)
Rhizomania	genus Benyvirus, Beet necrotic yellow vein virus (BNYVV) (fungal vector: Polymyxa betae)
Beet savoy	Suspected virus
Beet yellow vein	Suspected virus

== Phytoplasmal and sprioplasmal diseases ==
Phytoplasmal and sprioplasmal diseases
Beet latent rosette	Phytoplasma
Yellow wilt	Spiroplasma

== Miscellaneous diseases and disorders ==
Miscellaneous diseases and disorders
Heart rot	Boron deficiency
Scab	Streptomyces spp.
