= Grapevine leafroll-associated viruses =

Scientific classification
- (unranked): Virus
- Realm: Riboviria
- Kingdom: Orthornavirae
- Phylum: Kitrinoviricota
- Class: Alsuviricetes
- Order: Martellivirales
- Family: Closteroviridae

Groups included
- Grapevine leafroll-associated virus 1; Grapevine leafroll-associated virus 2; Grapevine leafroll-associated virus 3; Grapevine leafroll-associated virus 4; Grapevine leafroll-associated virus 7; Grapevine leafroll-associated virus 13

Cladistically included but traditionally excluded taxa
- Other viruses in Closteroviridae

Species of virus

Grapevine leafroll-associated virus (GLRaV) is a name for a group of viruses that infect grapevine.

Obscure mealybugs (Pseudococcus viburni) feed on the phloem of vines and woody-stemmed plants, especially pear and apple trees and grape vines. Some individuals are vectors for infectious pathogens and can transmit them from plant to plant while feeding; mealybug-spread grapevine leafroll associated virus type III (GRLaV-3), in particular, has wreaked havoc among the grapes of New Zealand, reducing the crop yield of infected vineyards by up to 60%.

The biggest problems in Grapevine Leafroll Disease are reduced grape yield, altered grape ripening, and altered grape chemistry. Leafroll viruses are associated with rugose wood condition of grapevine.
