= Rose leaf rosette-associated virus =

Virus classification
- (unranked): Virus
- Realm: Riboviria
- Kingdom: Orthornavirae
- Phylum: Kitrinoviricota
- Class: Alsuviricetes
- Order: Martellivirales
- Family: Closteroviridae
- Genus: Closterovirus
- Species: Closterovirus rosafolium

Species of virus

Rose leaf rosette-associated virus is a +ssRNA closterovirus which causes a unique, unusually dense and small rosette leaf habit on Rosa multiflora Thunb. branches.

DNA analyses of rose samples have not previously found closteroviruses, and thus they were previously thought to be unable to infect all Rosa, making RLRAV the first known.
