= Carnation necrotic fleck virus =

Virus classification
- (unranked): Virus
- Realm: Riboviria
- Kingdom: Orthornavirae
- Phylum: Kitrinoviricota
- Class: Alsuviricetes
- Order: Martellivirales
- Family: Closteroviridae
- Genus: Closterovirus
- Species: Closterovirus necrodianthi

Synonyms
- carnation yellow fleck virus carnation streak virus

Species of virus

Carnation necrotic fleck virus (CNFV) is a plant pathogenic virus of the family Closteroviridae.
