= Beet pseudoyellows virus =

Virus classification
- (unranked): Virus
- Realm: Riboviria
- Kingdom: Orthornavirae
- Phylum: Kitrinoviricota
- Class: Alsuviricetes
- Order: Martellivirales
- Family: Closteroviridae
- Genus: Crinivirus
- Species: Crinivirus pseudobetae

Synonyms
- Beet pseudo-yellows virus Duffus 1975

Species of virus

Beet pseudoyellows virus (BPYV) is a species of virus in the genus Crinivirus.

The virus was first recognised by James E. Duffus of the United States Department of Agriculture, and reported in 1975 under the title 'A new type of whitefly-transmitted disease – a link to the aphid-transmitted viruses'. Beet (Beta vulgaris) in a research greenhouse unexpectedly presented symptoms characteristic of the aphid-vectored virus Beet yellows virus, despite no aphids being present. Instead, greenhouse whiteflies (Trialeurodes vaporariorum) were present and determined to be the vector. The presumed new species of virus was designated 'Beet pseudo-yellows virus' (note the hyphen, omitted in the currently accepted name). Further investigation revealed the virus typically causes stunting, interveinal yellowing, and/or chlorotic spotting in its hosts, and that at least an additional 36 species of plants from various families are susceptible to infection.

== Images ==
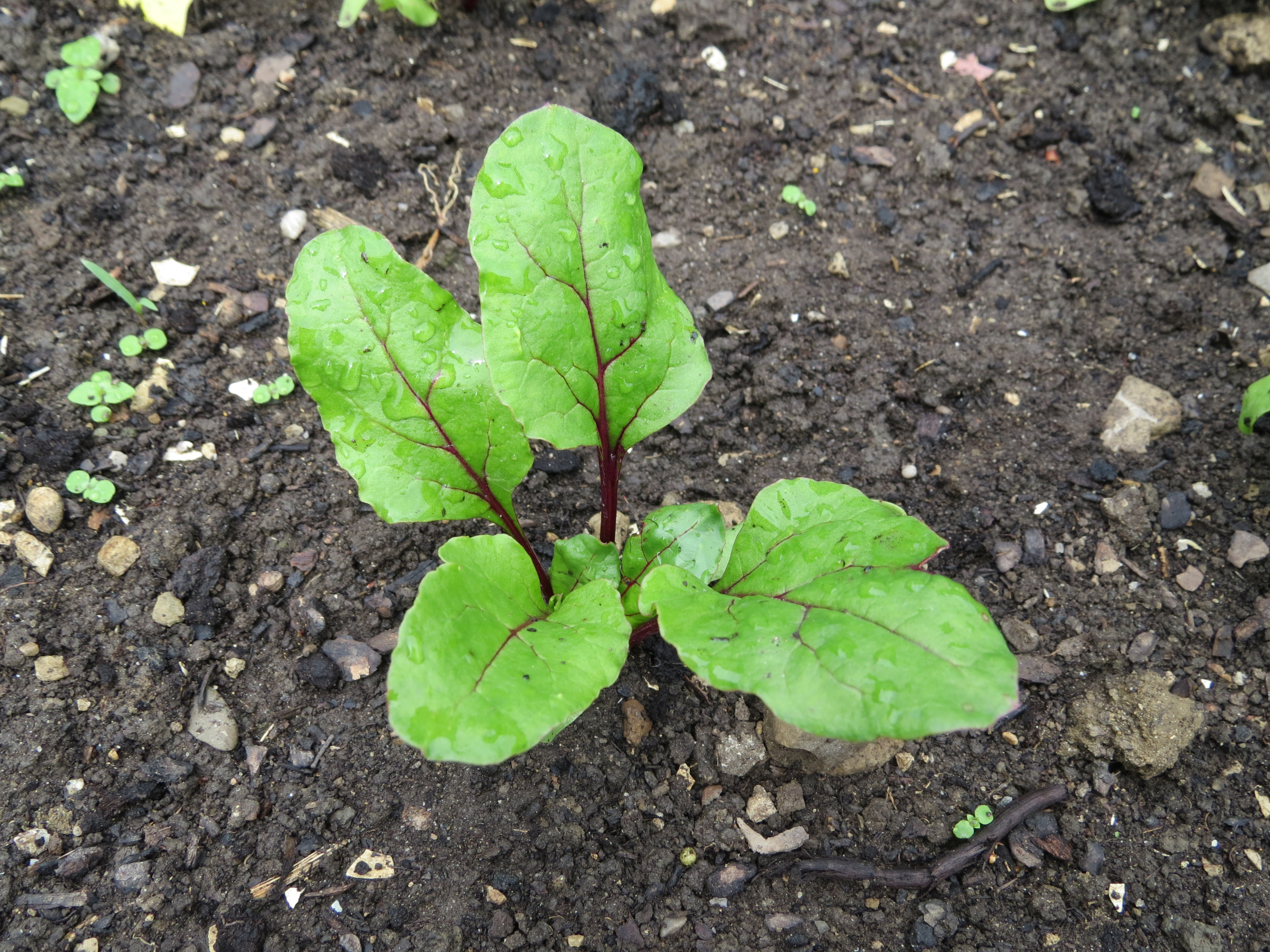
Beta vulgaris (uninfected individual) – first known host and namesake

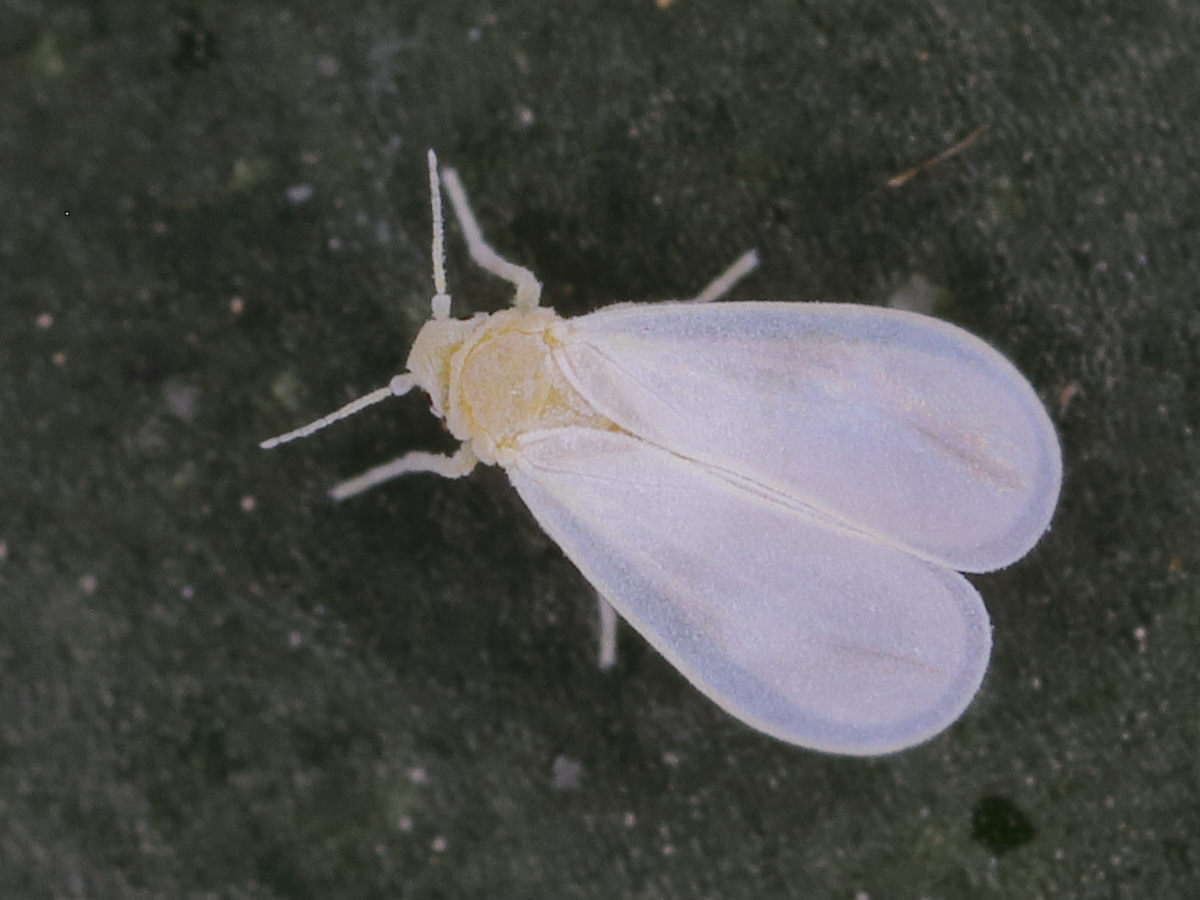
Trialeurodes vaporariorum – vector

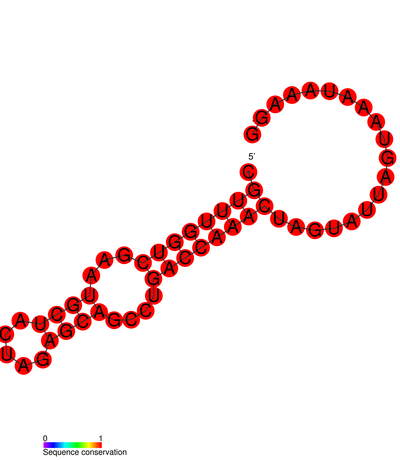
3'-terminal pseudoknot of BPYV: Predicted secondary structure from Rfam. Family RF01095.
