= Tomato chlorosis virus =

Virus classification
- (unranked): Virus
- Realm: Riboviria
- Kingdom: Orthornavirae
- Phylum: Kitrinoviricota
- Class: Alsuviricetes
- Order: Martellivirales
- Family: Closteroviridae
- Genus: Crinivirus
- Species: Crinivirus tomatichlorosis

Species of virus

Tomato chlorosis virus (ToCV) is an RNA virus belonging to the genus Crinivirus, a group of plant-infecting viruses in the family Closteroviridae.

Tomato chlorosis virus (ToCV) was originally discovered in the mid-1990s in greenhouse-grown tomato plants in north-central Florida, USA. It is an emerging whitefly-transmitted virus that can be found in a variety of tropical, subtropical, and temperate areas around the world. The plant pathogen causes a yellow leaf disorder in solanaceous crops including tomatoes. ToCV is transmissible by whiteflies, phloem-limited and causes symptoms of interveinal chlorosis followed by necrosis in the tomato plants leaves resulting in a reduced fruit yield. ToCV has a wide range of hosts such as pepper and potato. ToCV is transmitted in a semi-persistent manner by whiteflies of the Bemisia tabaci cryptic species complex (at least MEAM1, MED, and NW, formerly biotypes B, Q, and A, respectively), Trialeurodes vaporariorum, and T. abutiloneus. Although ToCV-resistant genotypes have been found in some wild tomato species, these are yet available commercially.

== Genome organization ==
So far, 17 full genome sequences of ToCV have been documented, with one originating from the United States, Spain Greece, Brazil, Taiwan, two from China, and ten from Korea. The ToCV genome exhibits the standard structure seen in bipartite criniviruses, consisting of two linear, positive-sense, single-stranded RNA molecules: RNA1 (8593–8596 nt) and RNA2 (8242–8247 nt). RNA1 harbors four open reading frames (ORF 1a/1b to ORF3), which could encode proteins linked to virus replication and the inhibition of gene silencing. RNA2 features nine ORFs (ORF4 to ORF12), potentially encoding proteins involved in virus encapsidation, cell-to-cell movement, membrane association, whitefly transmission, and the suppression of gene silencing. Both RNAs are enclosed in distinct flexuous rod particles, measuring approximately 800–850 nm in length.

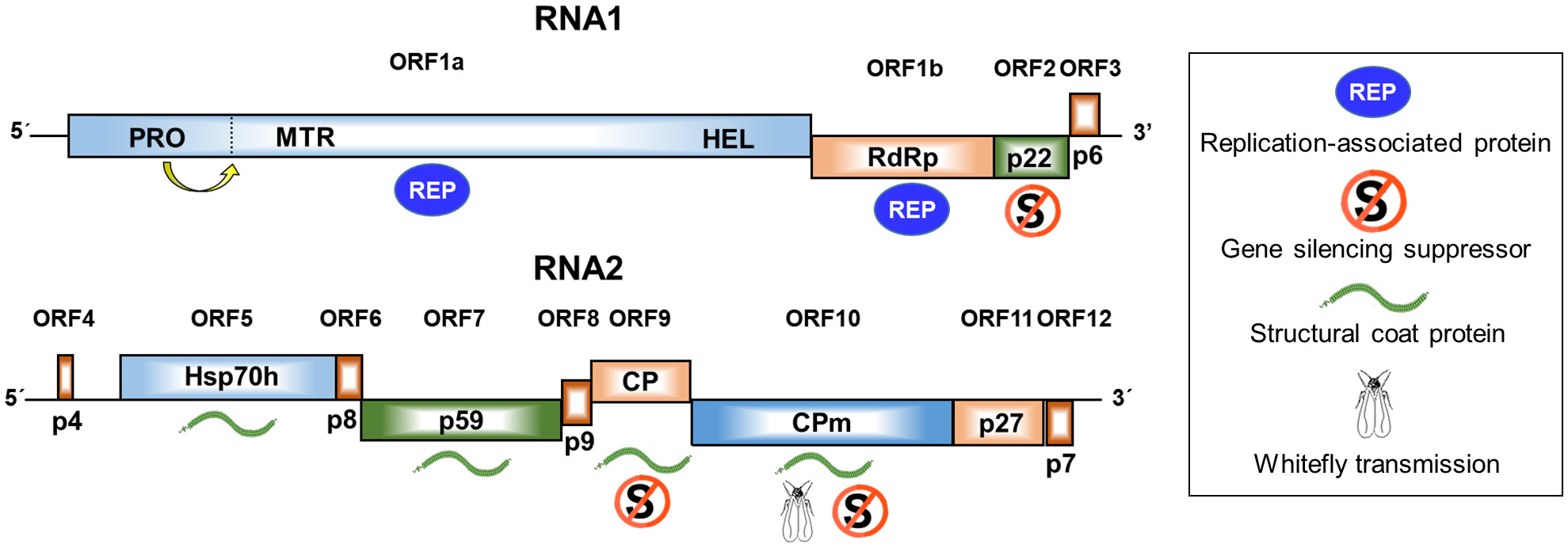
Schematic representation of the genomic structure of tomato chlorosis virus RNA1 and RNA2

Figure 2: Illustration depicting the genetic organization of RNA1 and RNA2 in tomato chlorosis virus.

Boxes depict open reading frames (ORF), with the potential protein products specified within. The inset displays symbols denoting the (presumed) functions of proteins: proteins linked to replication, suppressors of gene silencing, structural coat proteins, and those involved in whitefly transmission. CP stands for coat protein, CPm refers to the minor coat protein, HSP70h signifies the heat shock protein 70 homologue, HEL represents helicase, MTR stands for methyl transferase, PRO denotes proteinase, and RdRp indicates RNA-dependent RNA polymerase.

== Mode of transmission ==
Similar to other members of the crinivirus genus, ToCV is transmitted by whiteflies in a semi-persistent manner, making it one of just two criniviruses transmitted by whiteflies belonging to the Bemisia and Trialeurodes genera.

== Disease symptoms ==
The syndrome known as 'yellow leaf disorder' in tomatoes is characterized by the yellowing and thickening of leaves between the veins. Initial symptoms manifest on the lower leaves and progress towards the upper sections of the plant. Older leaves exhibit bronzing and necrosis, leading to a decrease in overall vigor and a reduction in fruit yield. In other host plants, prevalent symptoms involve interveinal chlorosis and mild yellowing observed on aging leaves.
