= Carrot yellow-leaf virus =

Carrot yellow leaf virus

Virus classification
- (unranked): Virus
- Realm: Riboviria
- Kingdom: Orthornavirae
- Phylum: Kitrinoviricota
- Class: Alsuviricetes
- Order: Martellivirales
- Family: Closteroviridae
- Genus: Closterovirus
- Species: Closterovirus flavicarotae

Species of virus

== Summary ==
=== Host ===
The carrot yellow-leaf virus (CYLV) infects carrots, particularly the carrot root cells. There are viruses that are similar to CYLV which affect hogweed and beet roots as well.

=== Major patterns of infection ===
There have been sporadic plagues of CYLV occurring in many countries across the world, most notably the United Kingdom, Germany, and Japan. Aphids are the main form of transmission. These insects spread the virus from one carrot patch to another. Once the virus infects the carrot, necrosis starts in the roots.

== Historical perspectives ==
=== Discovery ===
The carrot yellow-leaf virus was first isolated in Japanese carrots that had yellowing leaves. Using electron microscopy, the virus particle was found to be 1.6006 X 10^{12} nm long with a 3.7-nm helical pitch. These are characteristics from the genus Closterovirus. There was a suspected case found in the Netherlands that was originally going to be studied because it seemed similar to CYLV, but it ended up having a different host range.

=== Retrospective analysis ===
There was an attempt to inoculate another carrot with the sap of an infected carrot, but this was unsuccessful; the carrot did not become immune. Attempts to grow a virus in a carrot by mechanically injecting the virus into the carrot rather than naturally infecting it through an aphid has failed to produce more virus. It may be possible to use a PCR with degenerate primers to find DNA from multiple pathogens of the same genus of CYLV, but this will not detect new pathogens, so CYLV cannot be specifically isolated from the PCR amplified DNA.

=== Significant milestones ===
There have been major outbreaks in the United Kingdom causing economic damage for 20 years. There have currently been no treatments developed. At this point, virologists are simply trying to fully diagnose the infection.

=== Current and future study and treatment ===
Currently, virologists are working on using high-throughput sequencing to identify novel virus genomes from a sample. This can potentially be used for diagnosis of CYLV. There is still a need to modify Koch’s postulates to establish a cause and effect relationship between CYLV and root necrosis. This requires future experimentation using an agricultural environment to accurately mediate the transmission of the virus. A harvested virus cannot simply be placed into a healthy host and have the expected symptoms without the natural environment.

Right now, CYLV is being prevented more than treated since there are no viable treatment methods yet. One method of prevention is to remove carrots with yellowing leaves so that they do not infect other carrots in the patch. Using pesticides to kill aphids or nets to trap them will also limit the spread of the virus to other patches.

== Structure and classification ==
=== ICTV/Baltimore classification ===
For classifying the Carrot yellow-leaf virus, the Baltimore system and the International Committee of Taxonomy of Viruses system classifies this virus as closteroviridae, or a closterovirus.

=== Genome type ===
The +ssRNA genome is 15.5 to 19.3 kb, contains a 3’ terminus, and does not have a poly(A) tract. The 5’ terminus commonly has a methylated nucleotide cap. The virus genome is 1250-2200 nm in length and 10-13 nm in diameter.

=== Replication ===
In order to replicate, the carrot yellow leaf virus physically penetrates into the host cell. The virus then uncoats its capsid proteins and releases genomic +ssRNA into the host cytoplasm. The viral +ssRNA is translated into a processed ORF1 polyprotein to be replicated into viral proteins The carrot yellow leaf virus dsRNA genome is synthesized from the genomic ssRNA(+) within the host. The dsRNA genome is transcribed to produce new viral mRNAs/new ssRNA(+) genomes. Translation using host cell machinery produces new viral components to be assembled. Viral movement proteins mediate virion cell-to-cell transfer.

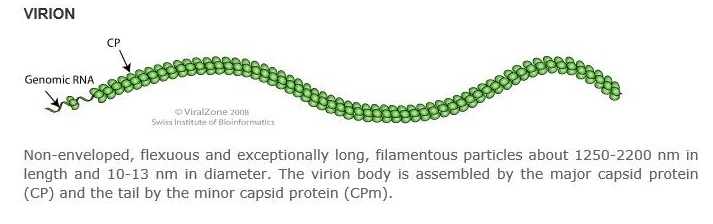
virion structure

=== Capsid components ===
The capsid for Carrot yellow-leaf virus possess a helical formation. The virion genomic +ssRNA, being a single-stranded plant virus genome, is covered in major capsid proteins, while the tail of virus is coated in minor capsid proteins.

=== Viral envelope ===
This virus is non-enveloped, being a member of the closteroviridae virus family.

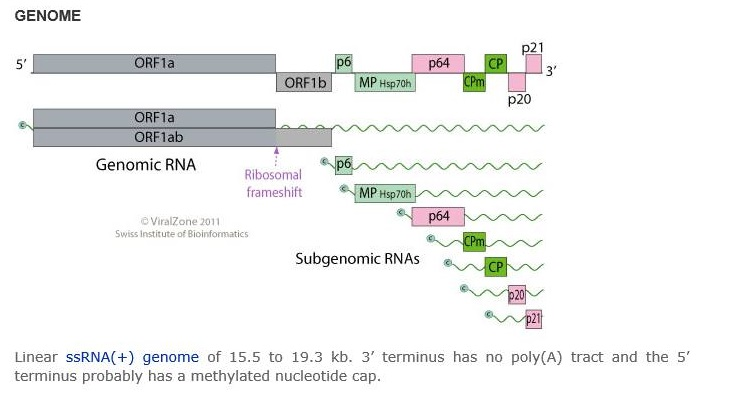
CYLV genome structure

=== Variation/subtypes ===
Carrot yellow-leaf virus is a variant of beet yellow virus. Both pose similar symptoms and genome structure as well as similar virion proteins.

== Epidemiology ==
=== Role in plant disease ===
The leaves of carrots infected with the CYLV virus become yellowish and the internal root core displays necrosis, which can extend from crown to tip. Some carrots can present necrosis just on the surface. The infection affects mainly the vascular tissue in carrots that circulates sugars and other metabolites (phloem).

=== Infection statistics ===
The first infection by the CYLV was reported in Japan in the carrot species Daucus carota in 1976.

The first occurrence reported in Europe of infection in carrots by CYLV was in 1985. In 2009, more than 10% of the yield in the United Kingdom was infected by the carrot yellow leaf virus. It is believed that this virus is the main causal pathogen of carrot necrosis and its removal would reduce the incidence of necrosis in carrots by 96%.

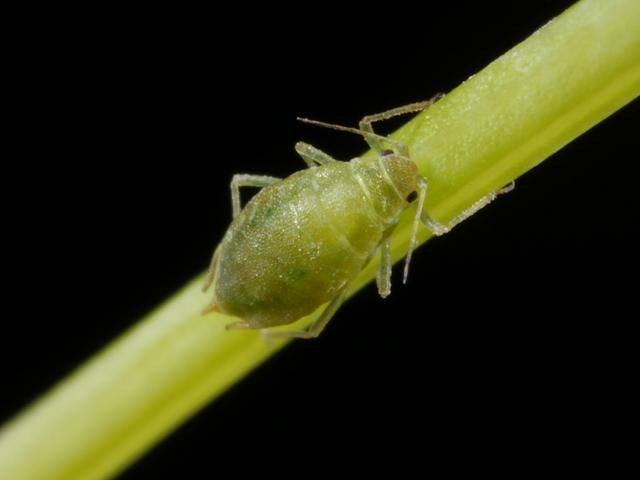
Aphid of the genus Cavariella. This aphid is known as the vector of the carrot yellow leaf virus (CYLV).

=== Transmission ===
The transmission of the CYLV occurs by mechanical inoculation of the plant by aphids of the genus Cavariella, popularly known as “plant lice”. The vector transmits the virus while feeding the host organic matter contained in the phloem. There is a minimum latent period of 7–18 hours after the vector has acquired the virus. The viruses remain circulative in the vector, but are not transmitted to their progeny insects, which means that the viral infection occurs horizontally. In addition, it was observed the vectors take 24 hours to be able to continue to transmit the viruses.

=== Control/prevention/treatment ===
Drugs have not been developed for the treatment of the symptoms of CYLV. Antivirals to control or eliminate the viral infection have not been developed. The only method available is the prevention of the virus by removal of the infected carrots which express some symptoms (yellow leaves, for example), in order to avoid the contamination of healthy carrots in the patch. Moreover, another prevention method corresponds to the use of insecticides, such as imidacloprid ('Confidor') and a mixture of lambda-cyhalothrin and pirimicarb ('Okapi'), which have been effective to control the vector of the virus and, consequently, to prevent the infection of the carrots.

== Infectious Cycle ==
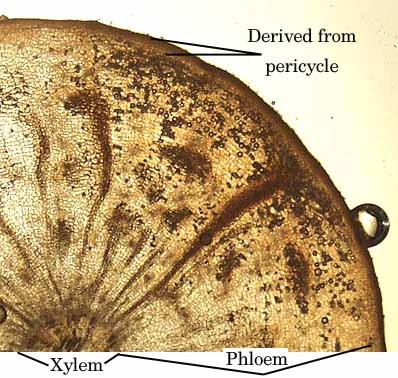
Cross section of a carrot root. Carrot Yellow-leaf virus has tropism for Phloem cells, the same location where Aphids feed.

=== Routes of entry ===
CYLV is transmitted by aphids, also known as plant lice. The family of Aphids or Aphididae belongs to the order Homoptera, suborder Sternorrhyncha. The insects feed on conductive tissue (phloem), which is responsible for transport of nutrients throughout the plant. The virus is transmitted by the aphid when it feeds on the carrot; it is transmitted horizontally, not vertically. This means a pregnant aphid does not transmit the virus to the offspring, and the virus is not transmitted after molting.

=== Major virulence factors ===
There is no research specifically on the cytopathic effect of CYLV, however there is a general pattern in the family Closteroviridae that might apply to this particular virus. Closteroviruses are usually phloem-limited, but some groups might infect parenchyma and mesophyll cells; therefore, closteroviruses are more often described simply as "phloem-associated" with regard to tissue tropism. That is why symptoms are associated with phloem; the cytopathology is mainly caused by vesicles containing virus particles, which is also a form of diagnosis. Another important viral mechanism is the capacity to escape the host's immune system. In plants, a common strategy is the use of interference RNA or RNAi, which are short sequences homologous to the viral genome. When these short sequences bind to the genome, they prevent transcription into dsDNA, therefore controlling the infection. Some viruses have developed proteins called Silencing Suppressors in response to RNAi. The mechanism is unknown, but mutation in those proteins allow the plant to recover from the viral infection and prevents systemic infections.

=== Host cell recognition, viral attachment and entry ===
The virus cell specificity depends more on the vector than on the virus itself. There are some hypotheses affirming that CYLF evolved to infect phloem cells because they are the most common feeding site for the vectors. During feeding, aphids transmit the virus into phloem cells. However, in order to spread the infection, viruses need to move from one cell to another. Using Citrus tristeza virus as an example of closterovirus, it is possible to observe two different types of movement: one from adjacent cells and one from long distance. In order to penetrate the thick cell wall, closteroviruses have specific movement proteins encoded in their genome, along with mechanisms to use host proteins to facilitate transport. One of the most important proteins for cell-to-cell movement is a Hsp70 homolog, or Hsp70h; it has this name because it is one of the heat shock proteins with a weight of 70kDa.

=== Viral replication, transcription, translation ===
Closteroviruses have a (+)ssRNA genome, so it needs to first be transcribed into dsDNA before translation. Replication also involves formation of subgenomic RNA. Replication happens in vesicles known as viral factories. Closteroviruses can have up to 10 Open Reading Frames (ORFs) in their genome that encode several enzymes, like RNA polymerase, methyltransferase, RNA helicase, and papain-like protease (L-pro). L-pro has an essential role in replication. The dsRNA is then used as a template for the replication of ssRNA which is then transcribed into mRNA and translated into viral proteins. Using Beet Yellow Virus as an example, it is possible to see that the virion is formed mainly by the major capsid protein. The virus has a short tail that is formed by the minor capsid protein. Cell mechanisms are used to translate these and all the other viral proteins.

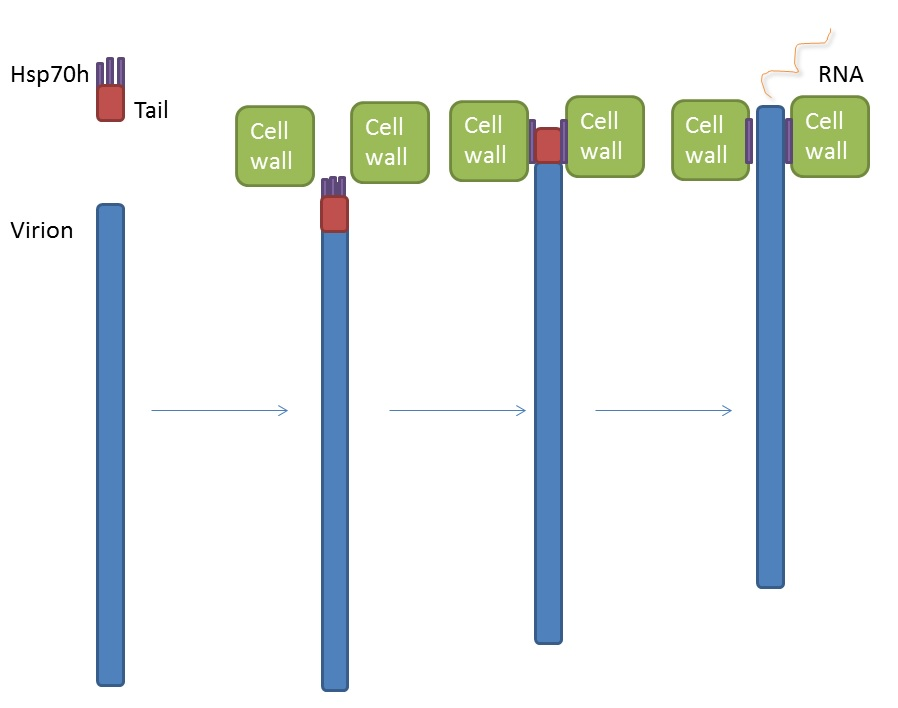
Model for hypothesis of cell movement between neighbour cells. CYLV virion particle assembles first, but it needs the "tail" and Hsp70h help to pass the channel.

=== Virion assembly and egress ===
The capsid proteins and ssRNA genome assemble and exit the cell. The major capsid protein is essential for virus assembly; mutations in the gene responsible for encoding it result in impairment of assembly. However, minor capsid protein is not essential for assembly nor genome protection. A virus with a mutated minor capsid protein could successfully assemble, but cell-to-cell movement is not possible. Therefore, the tail is essential for viral movement. Hsp70h, which was seen in cell-to-cell movement is also essential for viral movement because tail formation is only possible when Hsp70h is present. Cell movement is a process with three different stages:

- Hsp70h binds to the minor capsid protein tail and consequently it attaches to the major capsid protein virion
- Hsp70h binds to the cell wall channel and drives the virus through it. This process needs ATP.
- The tail disassembles when Hsp70h stays in the channel. Without the tail, the body is less stable and RNA is exposed into the neighbour cell cytoplasm; the viral genome has successfully infected another cell.

Egress to neighbour cells and to cell matrix happens in a similar manner.
