= Abutilon yellows virus =

Virus classification
- (unranked): Virus
- Realm: Riboviria
- Kingdom: Orthornavirae
- Phylum: Kitrinoviricota
- Class: Alsuviricetes
- Order: Martellivirales
- Family: Closteroviridae
- Genus: Crinivirus
- Species: Crinivirus abutilonis

Species of virus

Abutilon yellows virus (AbYV (sometimes AYB) is a virus of the genus Crinivirus.

Particle lengths were measured at 800-850 nm. Partial sequencing has taken place but full sequencing was not complete as of 2008.

Criniviruses are considered a threat to crops, though less so than viruses the other whitefly transmitted virus genus Begomovirus, which are predominant in both number and effect.

== Vector ==
The vector is the banded-wing whitefly, Trialeurodes abutiloneus.
