= Potato yellow vein virus =

Virus classification
- (unranked): Virus
- Realm: Riboviria
- Kingdom: Orthornavirae
- Phylum: Kitrinoviricota
- Class: Alsuviricetes
- Order: Martellivirales
- Family: Closteroviridae
- Genus: Crinivirus
- Species: Crinivirus flavisolani

Species of virus

Potato yellow vein virus (PYVV) is a plant pathogen of the Closteroviridae family. It is a whitefly-transmitted closterovirus vectored by Trialeurodes vaporariorum, which is known to cause a yellowing disease in potato crops in South America. PYVV RNA have a conserved 3'-terminal secondary structure, which includes a pseudoknot.
