= Crinivirus =

Virus classification
- (unranked): Virus
- Realm: Riboviria
- Kingdom: Orthornavirae
- Phylum: Kitrinoviricota
- Class: Alsuviricetes
- Order: Martellivirales
- Family: Closteroviridae
- Genus: Crinivirus

Species
- See text

Genus of viruses

3'-terminal pseudoknot in SPCSV
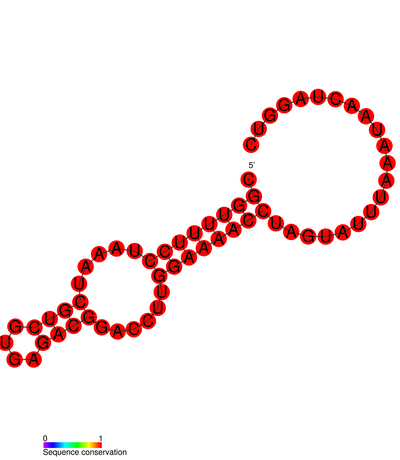
- Predicted secondary structure of the 3'-terminal pseudoknot in SPCSV

Identifiers
- Rfam: RF01091

Other data
- RNA type: Cis-reg
- Domain: Crinivirus
- PDB structures: PDBe

Crinivirus, formerly the lettuce infectious yellows virus group, is a genus of viruses, in the family Closteroviridae. They are linear, single-stranded positive sense RNA viruses (and are therefore group IV). There are 19 species in this genus. Diseases associated with this genus include: yellowing and necrosis, particularly affecting the phloem.

Examples of species whose entire genomes have been sequenced that are currently classified into the genus include the Sweet potato chlorotic stunt virus (SPCSV) and the Lettuce infectious yellows virus (LIYV).

== Genetics ==
The viruses of this genus have segmented, bipartite genomes that add up to 7,500–19,500 nucleotides in length. Their genomes also code for proteins that do not form part of the virion particles as well as structural proteins. The Universal Virus Database describes that their genome sequences near their 3'-ends are capable of hairpin-loop formation and also believe that their 5'-ends may have methylated caps. Each of the viral RNA molecules contains four hair-pin structures and a pseudoknot in the 3'UTR. The pseudoknot is unusual in that it contains a small stem-loop structure inside loop L1. In the related genus Closterovirus, these secondary structures have been found to be important in viral RNA replication.

== Structure ==
Viruses in the genus Crinivirus are non-enveloped, with bipartite filamentous geometries. The diameter is around 10-13 nm, with a length of 700-900 nm. Genomes are linear and bipartite, around 17.6kb in length.

Genus	Structure	Symmetry	Capsid	Genomic arrangement	Genomic segmentation
Crinivirus	Filamentous		Non-enveloped	Linear	Monopartite, bipartite, or tripartite

== Life cycle ==
Viral replication is cytoplasmic. Entry into the host cell is achieved by penetration into the host cell. Replication follows the positive stranded RNA virus replication model. Positive stranded RNA virus transcription is the method of transcription. The virus exits the host cell by tubule-guided viral movement. Plants serve as the natural host. The virus is transmitted via a vector (bemisia tabaci). Transmission route is mechanical.

Genus	Host details	Tissue tropism	Entry details	Release details	Replication site	Assembly site	Transmission
Crinivirus	Plants	None	Viral movement; mechanical inoculation	Viral movement	Cytoplasm	Cytoplasm	Mechanical inoculation: insects (whitefly)

== Taxonomy ==
The following species are assigned to the genus, listed by scientific name and followed by the exemplar virus of the species:

- Crinivirus abutilonis, Abutilon yellows virus
- Crinivirus arracaciae, Arracacha latent virus C
- Crinivirus chelidonii, Tetterwort vein chlorosis virus
- Crinivirus contagichlorosis, Tomato infectious chlorosis virus
- Crinivirus cucurbitae, Cucurbit yellow stunting disorder virus
- Crinivirus diodiae, Diodia vein chlorosis virus
- Crinivirus dioscoreae, Yam virus 1
- Crinivirus flavibetae, Bean yellow disorder virus
- Crinivirus flavisolani, Potato yellow vein virus
- Crinivirus ipomeae, Sweet potato chlorotic stunt virus
- Crinivirus kurdistanfragariae, Strawberry Kurdistan virus
- Crinivirus lactucachlorosi, Lettuce chlorosis virus
- Crinivirus lactucaflavi, Lettuce infectious yellows virus
- Crinivirus mori, Mulberry crinivirus
- Crinivirus palidofragariae, Strawberry pallidosis-associated virus
- Crinivirus papyriferae, Paper mulberry crinivirus 1
- Crinivirus pseudobetae, Beet pseudoyellows virus
- Crinivirus rubi, Blackberry yellow vein-associated virus
- Crinivirus tomatichlorosis, Tomato chlorosis virus
