= Sugar beet =

Plant grown commercially for sugar production

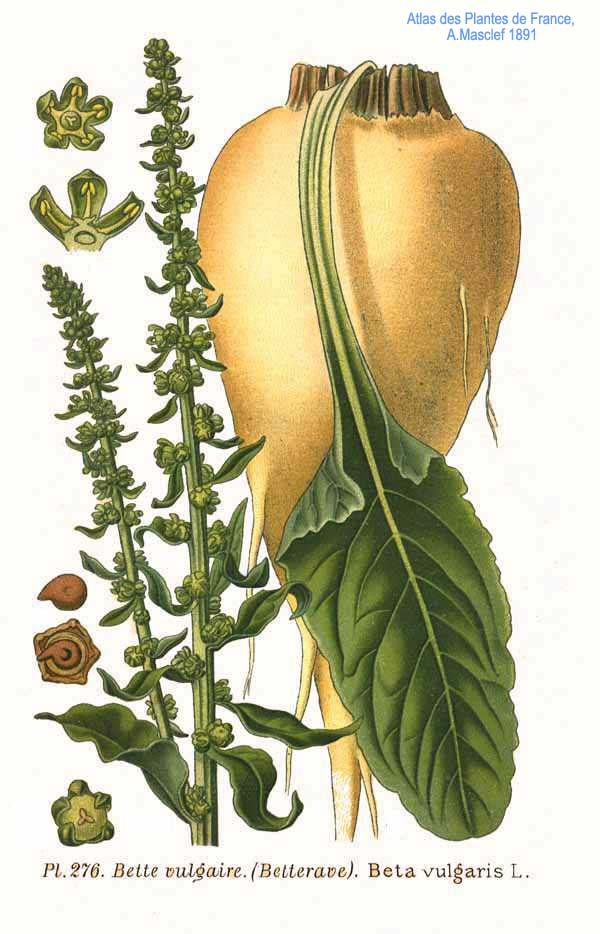
- Sugar beet, illustration of root, leaf, and flowering patterns
- Species: Beta vulgaris
- Subspecies: Beta vulgaris subsp. vulgaris (var. saccharifera)
- Cultivar group: Altissima Group
- Origin: Silesia, mid-18th century

A sugar beet is a plant whose root contains a high concentration of sucrose and is grown commercially for sugar production. In plant breeding, it is known as the Altissima cultivar group of the common beet (Beta vulgaris). Together with other beet cultivars, such as beetroot and chard, it belongs to the subspecies Beta vulgaris subsp. vulgaris but is classified as var. saccharifera. Its closest wild relative is the sea beet (Beta vulgaris subsp. maritima).

Sugar beets are grown in climates that are too cold for sugarcane. In 2024, Russia and Germany were the two largest sugar beet producers contributing to a world total of 294 million tonnes. Sugarcane accounts for most of the rest of sugar produced globally.

== Description ==
The sugar beet has a conical, white, fleshy root (a taproot) with a flat crown. The plant consists of the root and a rosette of leaves. Sugar is formed by photosynthesis in the leaves and is then stored in the root.

The root of the beet contains 75% water, about 20% sugar, and 5% pulp. The exact sugar content can vary between 12% and 21%, depending on the cultivar and growing conditions. Sugar is the primary value of sugar beet as a cash crop. The pulp, insoluble in water and mainly composed of cellulose, hemicellulose, lignin, and pectin, is used in animal feed. The byproducts of the sugar beet crop, such as pulp and molasses, add another 10% to the value of the harvest.

Sugar beets grow exclusively in the temperate zone, in contrast to sugarcane, which grows exclusively in the tropical and subtropical zones. The average weight of a sugar beet ranges between 0.5 and 1 kg (1.1 and 2.2 lb). Sugar beet foliage has a rich, brilliant green color and grows to a height of about 35 cm (14 in). The leaves are numerous and broad and grow in a tuft from the crown of the beet, which is usually level with or just above the ground surface.

== History ==
=== Discovery ===
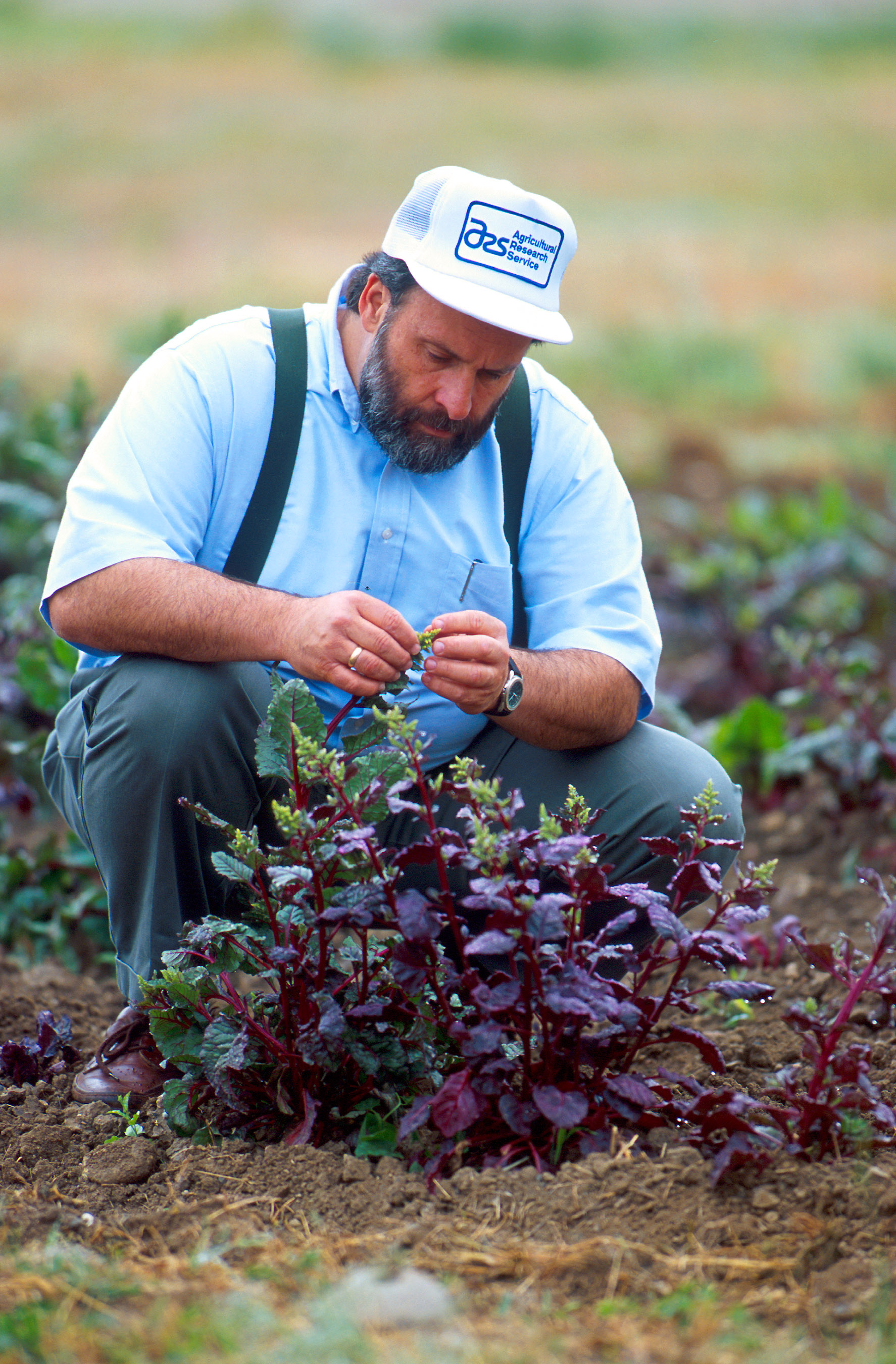
A geneticist evaluates sugar beet plants

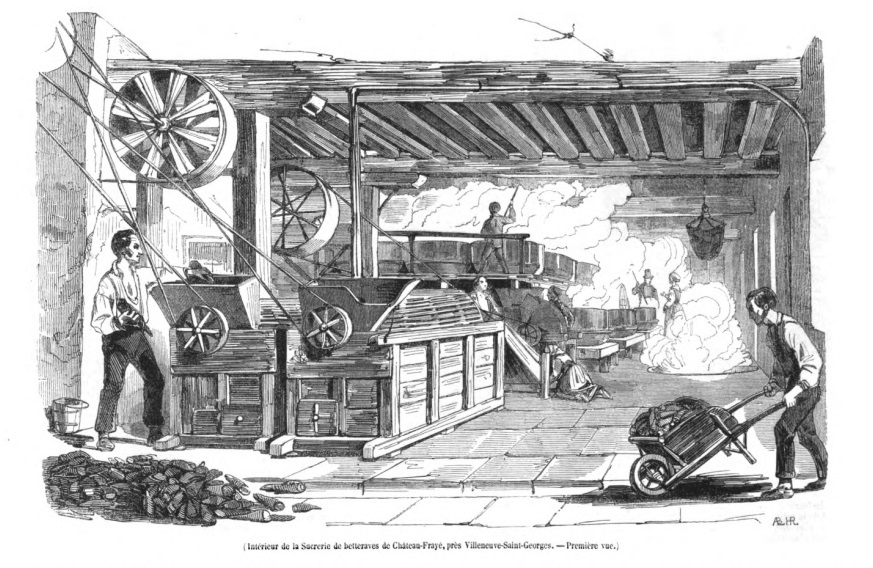
French sugar beet mill in operation in the 1840s

The species beet consists of several cultivar groups. The 16th-century French scientist Olivier de Serres discovered a process for preparing sugar syrup from (red) beetroot. He wrote: "The beet-root, when being boiled, yields a juice similar to syrup of sugar, which is beautiful to look at on account of its vermilion colour" (1575). Because crystallized cane sugar was already available and had a better taste, this process did not become popular.

Modern sugar beets date to the mid-18th century Silesia, where Frederick the Great, king of Prussia, subsidized experiments to develop processes for sugar extraction. In 1747, Andreas Sigismund Marggraf, professor of physics in the Academy of Science of Berlin, isolated sugar from beetroots and found them at concentrations of 1.3–1.6%. He also demonstrated that the sugar that could be extracted from beets was identical to that produced from cane. He found the best of these vegetable sources for sugar was the white beet. Despite Marggraf's success in isolating sugar from beets, it did not lead to commercial beet sugar production.

=== Development ===
Marggraf's student and successor Franz Karl Achard began plant breeding sugar beet in Kaulsdorf near Berlin in 1786. Achard started his plant breeding by evaluating 23 varieties of beet for sugar content. In the end he selected a local strain from Halberstadt in modern-day Saxony-Anhalt, Germany. Moritz Baron von Koppy and his son further selected white, conical tubers from this strain. The selection was named weiße schlesische Zuckerrübe, meaning white Silesian sugar beet. In about 1800, this cultivar contained about 5% to 6% sucrose by (dry) weight. It went on to become the progenitor of all modern sugar beets. The plant breeding process has continued since then, leading to a sucrose content of around 18% in modern varieties.

=== Beet sugar industry ===
Franz Karl Achard opened the world's first beet sugar factory in 1801, at Kunern, Silesia (now Konary, Poland). The idea to produce sugar from beet was soon introduced to France, whence the European sugar beet industry rapidly expanded, due to the difficulties in importing sugar cane sugar because of the continental blockade by Great Britain during the Napoleonic wars. By 1840, about 5% of the world's sugar was derived from sugar beets, and by 1880, this number had risen more than tenfold to over 50%. In North America, the first commercial production started in 1879 at a farm in Alvarado, California. The sugar beet was introduced to Chile by German settlers around 1850.

== Cultivation ==
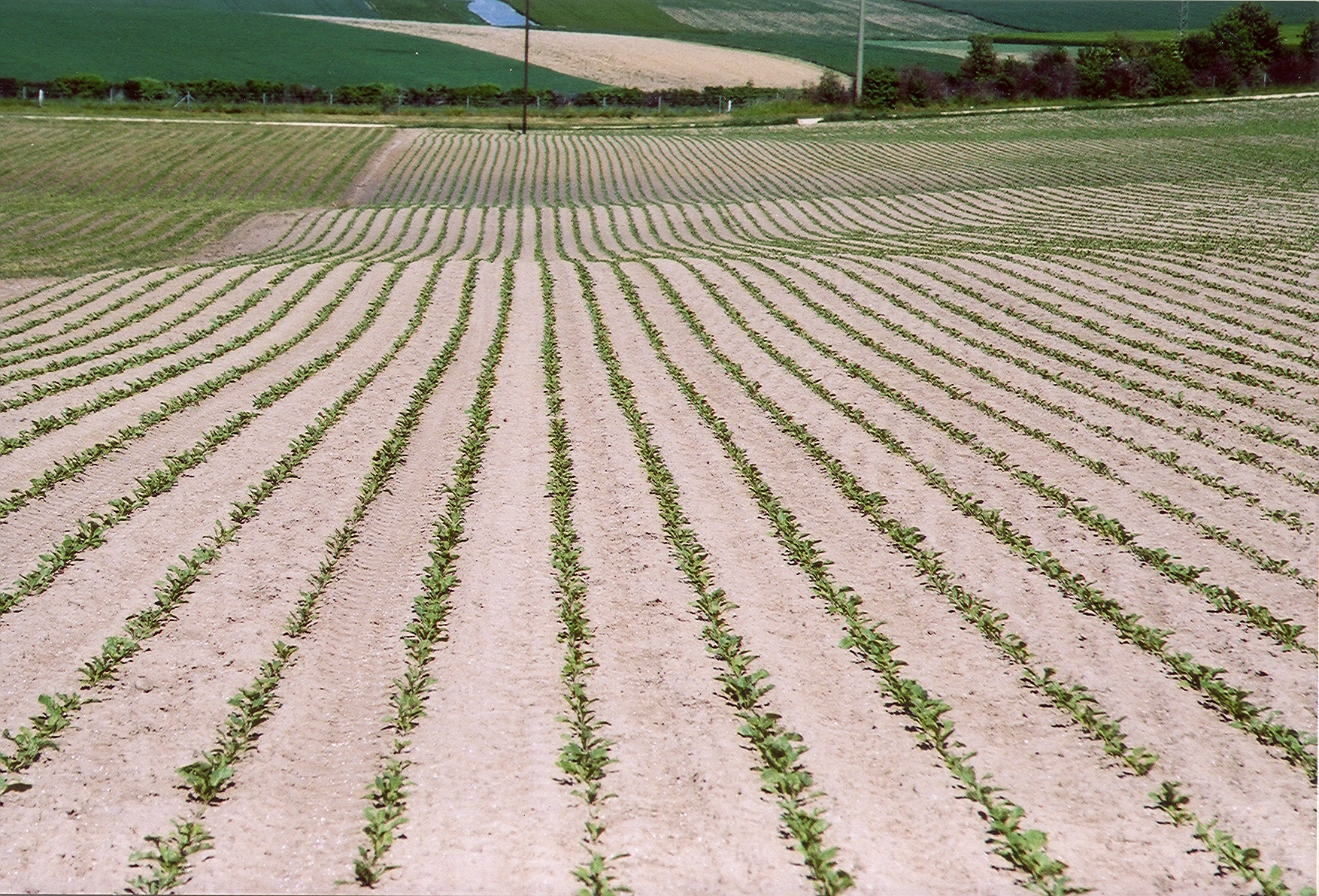
A sugar beet farm in Switzerland

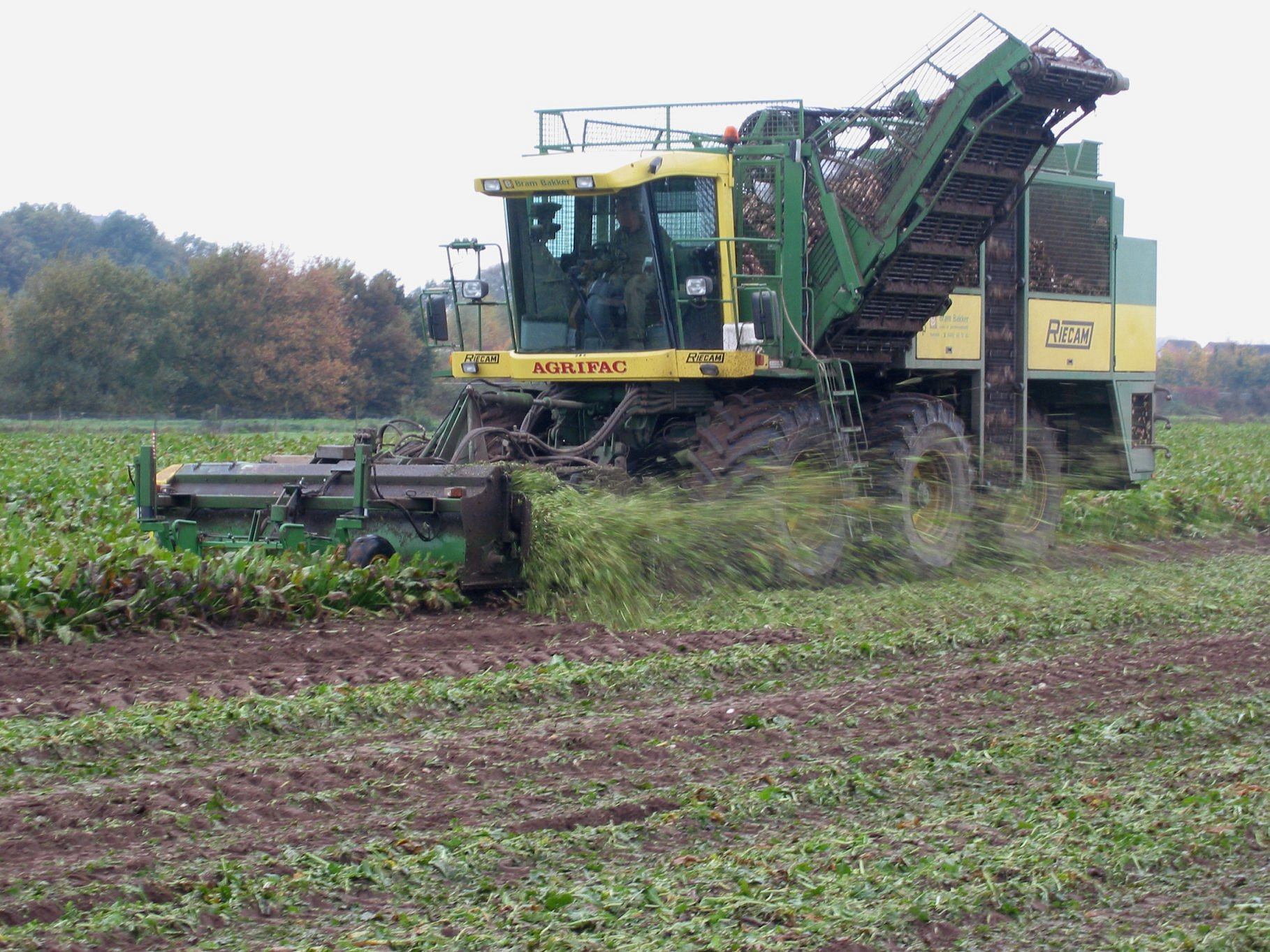
A beet harvester

The sugar beet, like sugarcane, needs a particular soil and a proper climate for its successful cultivation. The most important requirements are that the soil must contain a large supply of nutrients, be rich in humus, and be able to contain a great deal of moisture. A certain amount of alkali is not necessarily detrimental, as sugar beets are not especially susceptible to injury by some alkali. The ground should be fairly level and well-drained, especially where irrigation is practiced.

Generous crops can be grown in both sandy soil and heavy loams, but the ideal soil is a sandy loam, i.e., a mixture of organic matter, clay and sand. A subsoil of gravel, or the presence of hardpan, is not desirable, as cultivation to a depth of from 12 to 15 inches (30 to 38 cm) is necessary to produce the best results.

Climatic conditions, temperature, sunshine, rainfall and winds have an important bearing upon the success of sugar beet agriculture. A temperature ranging from 15 to 21 °C (59 to 70 °F) during the growing months is most favorable. In the absence of adequate irrigation, 460 mm (18 inches) of rainfall are necessary to raise an average crop. High winds are harmful, as they generally crust the land and prevent the young beets from coming through the ground. The best results are obtained along the coast of southern California, where warm, sunny days succeeded by cool, foggy nights seem to meet sugar beet's favored growth conditions. Sunshine of long duration but not of great intensity is the most important factor in the successful cultivation of sugar beets. Near the equator, the shorter days and the greater heat of the sun sharply reduce the sugar content in the beet.

In high elevation regions such as those of Idaho, Colorado and Utah, where the temperature is high during the daytime, but where the nights are cool, the quality of the sugar beet is excellent. In Michigan, the long summer days from the relatively high latitude (the Lower Peninsula, where production is concentrated, lies between the 41st and 46th parallels North) and the influence of the Great Lakes result in satisfactory climatic conditions for sugar beet culture. Sebewaing, Michigan, lies in the Thumb region of Michigan; both the region and state are major sugar beet producers. Sebewaing is home to one of four Michigan Sugar Company factories. The town sponsors an annual Michigan Sugar Festival.

To cultivate beets successfully, the land must be properly prepared. Deep ploughing is the first principle of beet culture. It allows the roots to penetrate the subsoil without much obstruction, thereby preventing the beet from growing out of the ground, besides enabling it to extract considerable nourishment and moisture from the lower soil. If the latter is too hard, the roots will not penetrate it readily and, as a result, the plant will be pushed up and out of the earth during the process of growth. A hard subsoil is impervious to water and prevents proper drainage. It should not be too loose, however, as this allows the water to pass through more freely than is desirable. Ideally, the soil should be deep, fairly fine and easily penetrable by the roots. It should also be capable of retaining moisture and at the same time admit of a free circulation of air and good drainage. Sugar beet crops exhaust the soil rapidly. Crop rotation is recommended and necessary. Normally, beets are grown in the same ground every third year, peas, beans or grain being raised the other two years.

In most temperate climates, beets are planted in the spring and harvested in the autumn. At the northern end of its range, growing seasons as short as 100 days can produce commercially viable sugar beet crops. In warmer climates, such as in California's Imperial Valley, sugar beets are a winter crop, planted in the autumn and harvested in the spring. In recent years, Syngenta has developed the so-called tropical sugar beet. It allows the plant to grow in tropical and subtropical regions. Beets are planted from a small seed; 1 kg (2.2 lb) of beet seed comprises 100,000 seeds and will plant over one hectare (2.5 acres) of ground (one pound or 500 grams will plant about one acre or 0.40 hectares.

Until the latter half of the 20th century, sugar beet production was highly labor-intensive, as weed control was managed by densely planting the crop, which then had to be manually thinned two or three times with a hoe during the growing season. Harvesting also required many workers. Although the roots could be lifted by a plough-like device that could be pulled by a horse team, the rest of the preparation was by hand. One laborer grabbed the beets by their leaves, knocked them together to shake free loose soil, and then laid them in a row, root to one side, greens to the other. A second worker equipped with a beet hook (a short-handled tool between a billhook and a sickle) followed behind, and would lift the beet and swiftly chop the crown and leaves from the root with a single action. Working this way, he would leave a row of beets that could be forked into the back of a cart.

Today, mechanical sowing, herbicide application for weed control, and mechanical harvesting have displaced this reliance on manual farm work. A root beater uses a series of blades to chop the leaf and crown (which is high in nonsugar impurities) from the root. The beet harvester lifts the root, and removes excess soil from the root in a single pass over the field. A modern harvester is typically able to cover six rows at the same time. The beets are dumped into trucks as the harvester rolls down the field, and then delivered to the factory. The conveyor then removes more soil.

If the beets are to be left for later delivery, they are formed into clamps. Straw bales are used to shield the beets from the weather. Provided the clamp is well built with the right amount of ventilation, the beets do not significantly deteriorate. Beets that freeze and then defrost, produce complex carbohydrates that cause severe production problems in the factory. In the UK, loads may be hand examined at the factory gate before being accepted.

In the US, the fall harvest begins with the first hard frost, which arrests photosynthesis and the further growth of the root. Depending on the local climate, it may be carried out over the course of a few weeks or be prolonged throughout the winter months. The harvest and processing of the beet is referred to as "the campaign", reflecting the organization required to deliver the crop at a steady rate to processing factories that run 24 hours a day for the duration of the harvest and processing (for the UK, the campaign lasts about five months). In the Netherlands, this period is known as de bietencampagne, a time to be careful when driving on local roads in the area while the beets are being grown, because the naturally high clay content of the soil tends to cause slippery roads when soil falls from the trailers during transport.

== Production ==
Sugar beet production 2024, millions of tonnes
| Russia | 46.7 |
| Germany | 36.7 |
| France | 32.6 |
| United States | 32.0 |
| Turkey | 23.0 |
| Poland | 18.4 |
| World | 293.6 |
Source: FAOSTAT of the United Nations

In 2024, world production of sugar beets was 294 million tonnes, led by Russia and Germany.

Sugar beet yield

Sugar beet production

== Sugar extraction ==
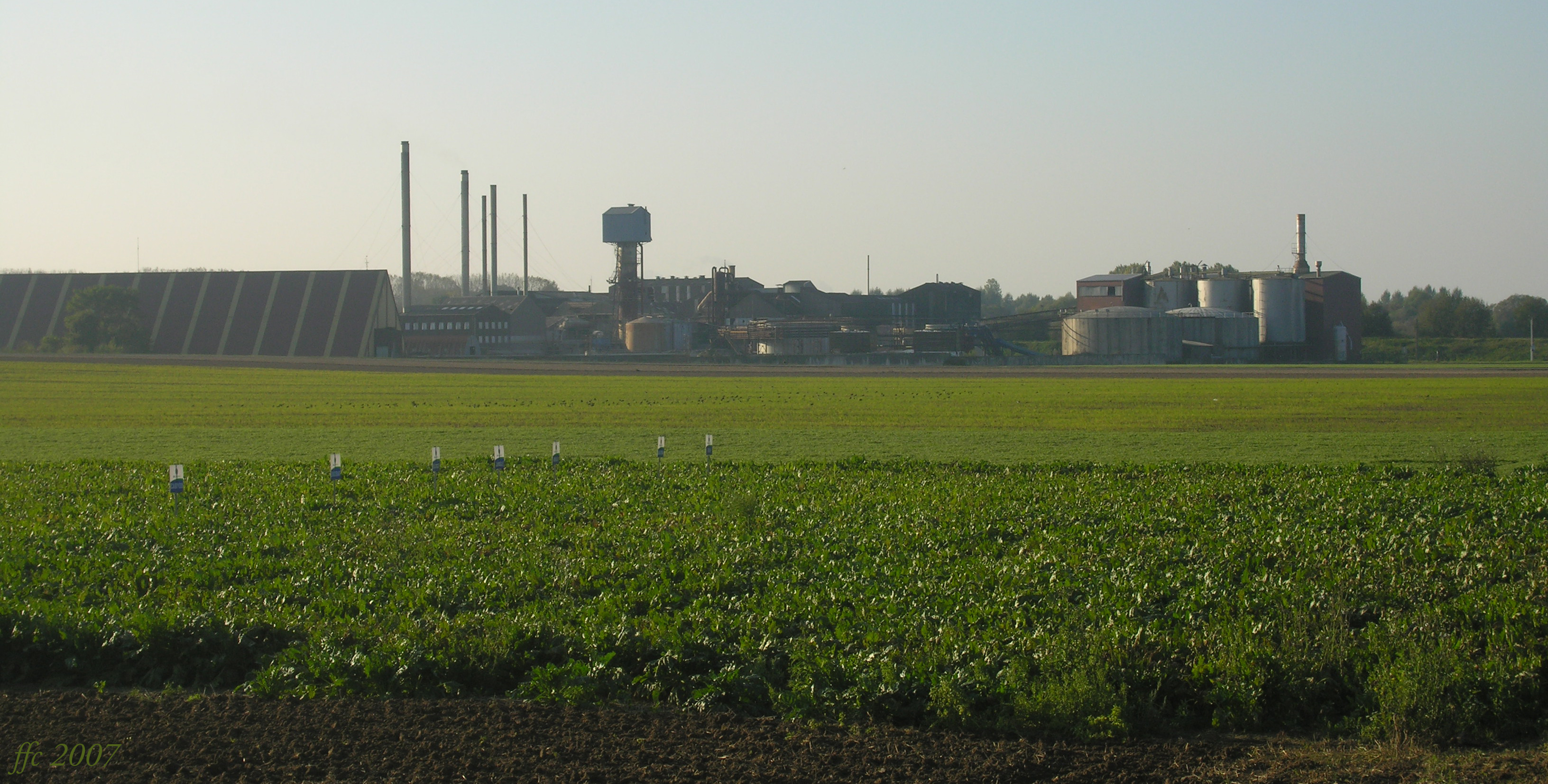
A sugar beet farm in Belgium: Beyond the field is the sugar factory.

Most sugar beet are used to create white sugar. This is done in a beet sugar factory, often abbreviated to sugar factory. Nowadays these usually also act as a sugar refinery, but historically the beet sugar factory produced raw sugar and the sugar refinery refined raw sugar to create white sugar.

=== Sugar factory ===
In the 1960s, beet sugar processing was described as consisting of these steps.

- Harvesting and storage in a way that preserves the beet while they wait to be processed
- Washing and scrubbing to remove soil and debris
- Slicing the beet in small pieces called cossettes or chips
- Removing the sugar from the beet in an osmosis process, resulting in raw juice and beet pulp.

Nowadays, most sugar factories then refine the raw juice themselves, without moving it to a sugar refinery. The beet pulp is processed on site to become cattle fodder.

=== Sugar refinery ===
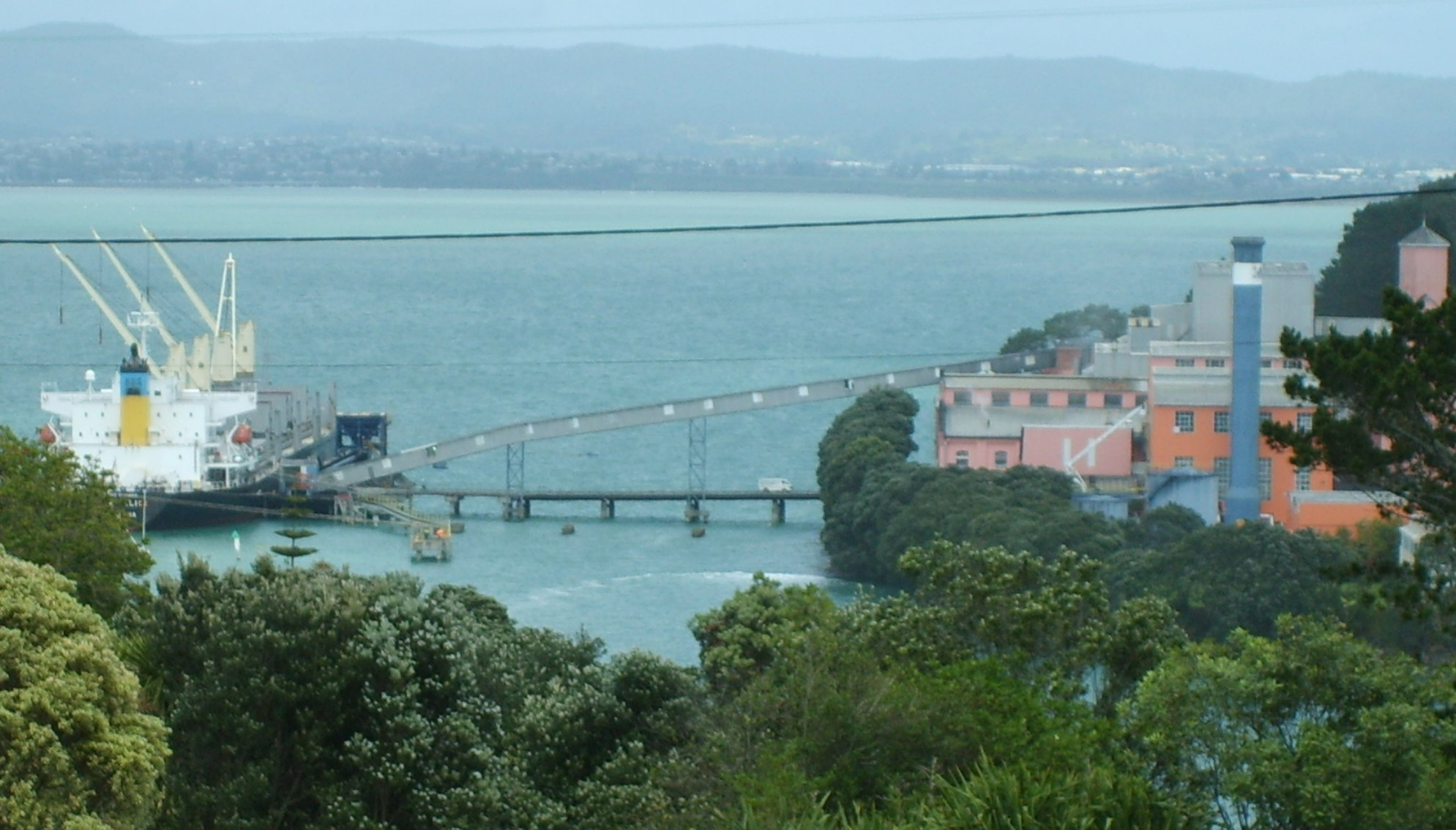
The Chelsea Sugar Refinery in New Zealand

The next steps to produce white sugar are not specific for producing sugar from sugar beet. They also apply to producing white sugar from sugar cane. As such, they belong to the sugar refining process, not particularly to the beet sugar production process.

- Purification, the raw juice undergoes a chemical process to remove impurities and create thin juice.
- Evaporation, the thin juice is concentrated by evaporation to make a "thick juice", roughly 60% sucrose by weight.
- Crystallization, by boiling under reduced pressure the sugar liquor is turned into crystals and remaining liquor.
- Centrifugation, in a centrifuge the white sugar crystals are separated from the remaining sugar liquor.
- The remaining liquor is then boiled and centrifuged, producing a lower grade of crystallised sugar (which is redissolved to feed the white sugar pans) and molasses.
- Further sugar can be recovered from the molasses by methods such as the Steffen Process.

== Ethanol production ==
=== From molasses ===
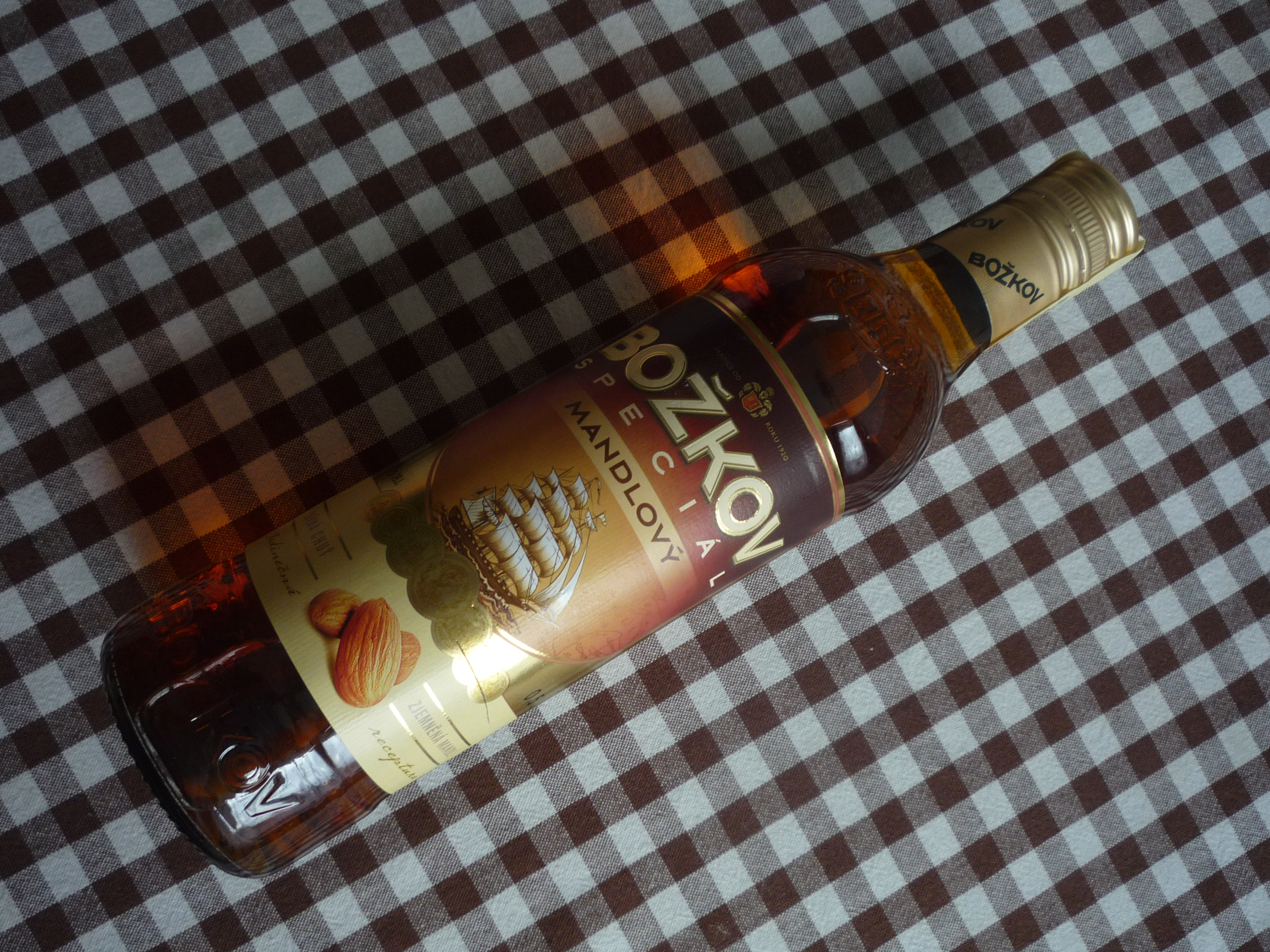
Tuzemák, a sugar-beet-based alcohol from Czechia

There are two obvious methods to produce alcohol (ethanol) from sugar beet. The first method produces alcohol as a byproduct of manufacturing sugar. It is about fermenting the sugar beet molasses that are left after (the second) centrifugation. This strongly resembles the manufacture of rum from sugar cane molasses. In a number of countries, notably the Czech Republic and Slovakia, this analogy led to making a rum-like distilled spirit called Tuzemak. On the Åland Islands, a similar drink is made under the brand name Kobba Libre.

=== From sugar beet ===
The second method produces alcohol by directly fermenting sugar beets without first processing them into sugar. The idea to distill sugar from the beet came up soon after the first beet sugar factory was established. Between 1852 and 1854 Champonnois devised a good system to distill alcohol from sugar beet. Within a few years a large sugar distilling industry was created in France. The current process to produce alcohol by fermenting and distilling sugar beet consists of these steps:

- Adding Starch milk
- Liquefaction and Saccharification
- Fermentation in fermentation vats
- Distillation
- Dehydration, this results in Bioethanol
- Rectification
- Refining, the result is a highly pure alcohol

Large sugar beet distilleries remain limited to Europe. In 2023 Tereos had 8 beet sugar distilleries, located in France, Czechia and Romania.

In many European countries rectified spirit from sugar beet is used to make Liquor, e.g. vodka, Gin etc..

== Other uses ==
=== Sugary syrup ===
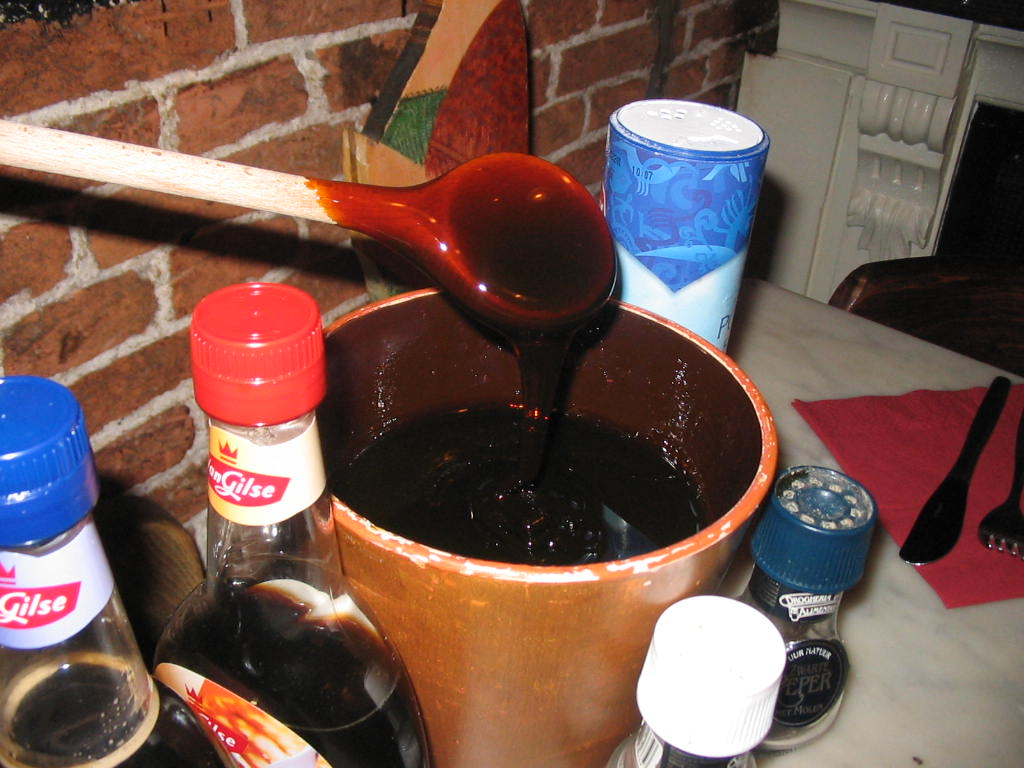
Traditional Dutch stroop and the bottled version

An unrefined sugary syrup can be produced directly from sugar beet. This thick, dark syrup is produced by cooking shredded sugar beet for several hours, then pressing the resulting mash and concentrating the juice produced until it has a consistency similar to that of honey. No other ingredients are used.

In Germany, particularly the Rhineland area, and in the Netherlands, this sugar beet syrup (called Zuckerrüben-Sirup or Zapp in German, or Suikerstroop in Dutch) is used as a spread for sandwiches, as well as for sweetening sauces, cakes and desserts. Dutch people generally top their pancakes with stroop. In Poland, the syrup is referred to as fiut (alternative spelling: fjut, commonly anglicized as phut) or cyrop.

Suikerstroop made according to the Dutch tradition is a Traditional Speciality Guaranteed under EU and UK law. Commercially, if the syrup has a dextrose equivalency (DE) above 30, the product has to be hydrolyzed and converted to a high-fructose syrup, much like high-fructose corn syrup, or isoglucose syrup in the EU.

=== Uridine ===
Uridine can be isolated from sugar beet.

=== Alternative fuel ===
BP and Associated British Foods plan to use agricultural surpluses of sugar beet to produce biobutanol in East Anglia in the United Kingdom.

The feedstock-to-yield ratio for sugarbeet is 56:9. Therefore, it takes 6.22 kg of sugar beet to produce 1 kg of ethanol (approximately 1.27 L at room temperature). In 2006 it was found that producing ethanol from sugar beet or cane became profitable when the market price for ethanol were close to $4 per U.S. gallon. According to Atlantic Biomass president Robert Kozak, a study at the University of Maryland Eastern Shore, indicates sugar beets appear capable of producing 860 to 900 US gallons (3,300 to 3,400 L) of ethanol per acre (4000 m2).

=== Cattle feed ===
In New Zealand, sugar beet is widely grown and harvested as feed for dairy cattle. It is regarded as superior to fodder beet, because it has a lower water content (resulting in better storage properties). Both the beet bulb and the leaves (with 25% protein) are fed to cattle. Although long considered toxic to cattle, harvested beet bulbs can be fed to cattle if they are appropriately transitioned to their new diet. Dairy cattle in New Zealand can thrive on just pasture and beets, without silage or other supplementary feed. The crop is also now grown in some parts of Australia as cattle feed.

== Agriculture ==
Sugar beet farming using dam culture method. Used in Brazil, Russia, Germany, France, Ukraine, Turkey, China, and Poland

Sugar beets are an important part of a crop rotation cycle.

Sugar beet plants are susceptible to Rhizomania ("root madness"), which turns the bulbous tap root into many small roots, making the crop economically unprocessable. Strict controls are enforced in European countries to prevent the spread, but it is already present in some areas. It is also susceptible to both the beet leaf curl virus, which causes crinkling and stunting of the leaves and beet yellows virus.

Continual research looks for varieties with resistance, as well as increased sugar yield. Sugar beet breeding research in the United States is most prominently conducted at various USDA Agricultural Research Stations, including one in Fort Collins, Colorado, headed by Linda Hanson and Leonard Panella; one in Fargo, North Dakota, headed by John Wieland; and one at Michigan State University in East Lansing, Michigan, headed by Rachel Naegele.

Other economically important members of the subfamily Chenopodioideae:

- Beetroot
- Chard
- Mangelwurzel or fodder beet

=== Genetic modification ===
In the United States, genetically modified sugar beets, engineered for resistance to glyphosate, a herbicide marketed as Roundup, were developed by Monsanto as a genetically modified crop. In 2005, the US Department of Agriculture-Animal and Plant Health Inspection Service (USDA-APHIS) deregulated glyphosate-resistant sugar beets after it conducted an environmental assessment and determined glyphosate-resistant sugar beets were highly unlikely to become a plant pest. Sugar from glyphosate-resistant sugar beets has been approved for human and animal consumption in multiple countries, but commercial production of biotech beets has been approved only in the United States and Canada. Studies have concluded the sugar from glyphosate-resistant sugar beets has the same nutritional value as sugar from conventional sugar beets. After deregulation in 2005, glyphosate-resistant sugar beets were extensively adopted in the United States. About 95% of sugar beet acres in the US were planted with glyphosate-resistant seed in 2011.

Weeds may be chemically controlled using glyphosate without harming the crop. After planting sugar beet seed, weeds emerge in fields and growers apply glyphosate to control them. Glyphosate is commonly used in field crops because it controls a broad spectrum of weed species and has a low toxicity. A study from the UK suggests yields of genetically modified beet were greater than conventional, while another from the North Dakota State University extension service found lower yields. The introduction of glyphosate-resistant sugar beets may contribute to the growing number of glyphosate-resistant weeds, so Monsanto has developed a program to encourage growers to use different herbicide modes of action to control their weeds.

In 2008, the Center for Food Safety, the Sierra Club, the Organic Seed Alliance and High Mowing Seeds filed a lawsuit against USDA-APHIS regarding their decision to deregulate glyphosate-resistant sugar beets in 2005. The organizations expressed concerns regarding glyphosate-resistant sugar beets' ability to potentially cross-pollinate with conventional sugar beets. U.S. District Judge Jeffrey S. White, US District Court for the Northern District of California, revoked the deregulation of glyphosate-resistant sugar beets and declared it unlawful for growers to plant glyphosate-resistant sugar beets in the spring of 2011. Believing a sugar shortage would occur USDA-APHIS developed three options in the environmental assessment to address the concerns of environmentalists. In 2011, a federal appeals court for the Northern district of California in San Francisco overturned the ruling.

== Genome and genetics ==
The sugar beet genome shares a triplication event somewhere super-Caryophyllales and at or sub-Eudicots. It has been sequenced and two reference genome sequences have already been generated. The genome size of the sugar beet is approximately 731 (714–758) Megabases, and sugar beet DNA is packaged in 18 metacentric chromosomes (2n=2x=18). All sugar beet centromeres are made up of a single satellite DNA family and centromere-specific LTR retrotransposons. More than 60% of sugar beet's DNA is repetitive, mostly distributed in a dispersed way along the chromosomes.

Crop wild beet populations (B. vulgaris ssp. maritima) have been sequenced as well, allowing for identification of the resistance gene Rz2 in the wild progenitor. Rz2 confers resistance to rhizomania, commonly known as the sugar beet root madness disease.

== Breeding ==
Sugar beets have been bred for increased sugar content, from 8% to 18% in the 200 years up to 2013, resistance to viral and fungal diseases, increased taproot size, monogermy, and less bolting. Breeding has been eased by discovery of a cytoplasmic male sterility line, which has especially been useful in yield breeding.
