= Wheat yellow leaf virus =

Virus classification
- (unranked): Virus
- Realm: Riboviria
- Kingdom: Orthornavirae
- Phylum: Kitrinoviricota
- Class: Alsuviricetes
- Order: Martellivirales
- Family: Closteroviridae
- Genus: Closterovirus
- Species: Closterovirus flavitritici

Species of virus

Wheat yellow leaf virus (WYLV) is a wheat (Triticum spp. L.), barley (Hordeum vulgare L.), rye (Secale cereale M.Bieb.), and oat (Avena sativa L.) pathogenic virus of the family Closteroviridae. WYLV virions are 1600–1850 nm in length and 10 nm in diameter. The virus, like other members of its genus, is transmitted by aphids. Identified vectors include Rhopalosiphum padi L. and R. maidis Fitch. (Aphididae). The virus has been identified in crop plants in Japan, China, and Italy. Native host plants include Italian ryegrass (Festuca perennis Lam.) in Europe and Agropyron tsukushiense var. transiens Ohwi in Japan. The virus proliferates in the phloem of its host plants, interfering with the plant's ability to produce sufficient chlorophyll (Chlorosis), causing the leaves to yellow and the plant to die.
