= Grapevine leafroll-associated virus 3 =

Virus classification
- (unranked): Virus
- Realm: Riboviria
- Kingdom: Orthornavirae
- Phylum: Kitrinoviricota
- Class: Alsuviricetes
- Order: Martellivirales
- Family: Closteroviridae
- Genus: Ampelovirus
- Species: Ampelovirus trivitis

Species of virus

Grapevine leafroll-associated virus 3 (GLRaV-3) is a positive-sense single-stranded RNA plant virus in the family Closteroviridae, genus Ampelovirus.

It is the principal causal agent of grapevine leafroll disease (GLD), a globally distributed disease complex that reduces yield and fruit quality in Vitis vinifera. Natural transmission is by mealybugs and soft scale insects; the virus is also disseminated via infected propagation material.

== Taxonomy and classification ==
GLRaV-3 belongs to the genus Ampelovirus within the family Closteroviridae. Viruses of Ampelovirus characteristically have long flexuous filamentous particles and are transmitted by mealybugs or soft scale insects. GLRaV-3 shares these features and has been continually refined in classification as more variants were discovered.

== Genome and molecular biology ==
The genome of GLRaV-3 is around 18–19 kb, encoding approximately 12 ORFs including the replication module (papain-like protease, methyltransferase, helicase, RdRP), HSP70h, the major coat protein (CP) and minor coat protein (CPm), plus small accessory ORFs. There is substantial genetic variation among isolates: multiple phylogenetic groups have been defined, and certain variants lack ORF2 or have divergent genomic regions.

== Symptoms and disease ==
In red-fruited grape cultivars, GLD symptoms typically include interveinal reddening of leaves with green veins, leaf rolling downward, and delayed ripening of fruit. In white-fruited cultivars, symptoms may be less dramatic—leaf chlorosis (yellowing) and rolling may occur.

Infected vines can show reduced sugar accumulation (Brix), increased acidity, lower anthocyanin in red grapes, lower vigor, and diminished yield—often tens of percent compared to healthy vines.

== Transmission and epidemiology ==
GLRaV-3 is spread primarily via two routes: (1) through infected propagation material (grafts, cuttings, rootstocks), and (2) via insect vectors—especially mealybugs (family Pseudococcidae) and certain soft scale insects (Coccidae). For example, experiments with the vine mealybug (Planococcus ficus) demonstrated semipersistent transmission: acquisition and inoculation within ~24 h, retention up to several days, and first-instar crawlers being more efficient than adults.

== Management ==
There is no cure for infected vines, so management focuses on prevention and containment. Key strategies include:

1. Planting certified virus-tested (“clean”) propagation material.

2. Mapping and removing (roguing) infected vines early to minimise spread.

3. Controlling vector populations (mealybugs and scales) using integrated pest management: monitoring, insecticide treatments upon crawler emergence, biological controls, and pheromone-based mating disruption.
