= Little cherry disease =

Viral disease of cherry trees

Little cherry disease or LChD, sometimes referred to as little cherry, K & S little cherry or sour cherry decline, is a viral infectious disease that affects cherry trees, most notably sweet cherries (Prunus avium) and sour cherries (Prunus cerasus). Little cherry disease should not be confused with cherry buckskin disease, which is caused by Phytoplasma. Note that both diseases are among the diseases referred to as cherry decline.

== Causes ==
Little cherry virus 1 & 2

Virus classification
- (unranked): Virus
- Realm: Riboviria
- Kingdom: Orthornavirae
- Phylum: Kitrinoviricota
- Class: Alsuviricetes
- Order: Martellivirales
- Family: Closteroviridae

Species
- Little cherry virus 1 (Velarivirus nanoavii); Little cherry virus 2 (Ampelovirus nanoavii)

Little cherry disease is associated with two filamentous plant viruses of the family Closteroviridae, little cherry virus-1 (LChV-1) and little cherry virus-2 (LChV-2). Whereas little cherry virus-2 belongs to the genus Ampelovirus, little cherry virus-1 has been assigned (2013) to the genus Velarivirus. Both viruses are found in the phloem companion and parenchyma cells of infected plants. Little cherry virus-1 has been reported in, apart from cherry trees, plum, almond and peach.

Due to considerable genetic variation among strains, isolates from both viruses have previously been designated as belonging to new and separate species before being reassigned to one of the two recognized viruses.

== Epidemiology ==
Long-distance spread of the disease occurs through the planting of infected trees, as well as budding and grafting of infected tissue. To prevent the establishment of the disease, guidelines typically call for testing of rootstocks and budwood before planting, removal of all trees known and suspected to be infected and eradication of ornamental and wild cherry trees from the surrounding area.

Short-distance spread of the disease occurs through transmission of the viruses by insect vectors. Little cherry virus-2 is spread by scale insects of the family Pseudococcidae, primarily the apple mealybug (Phenacoccus aceris). In areas where the apple mealybug is commonplace, application of insecticides prior to cutting infected trees are routinely used to stop the spread of little cherry disease within orchards. Little cherry virus-1 is spread by an unknown vector. Little cherry disease likely originated in Japan and spread with ornamental cherry trees world-wide; many of the top cherry producing nations in the world have reported infections, including USA, Italy and Spain.

== Signs and symptoms ==
The symptoms of little cherry disease in sweet and sour cherries varies greatly depending on cultivar, with respect to both the range and the severity of symptoms; some cultivars show signs of tolerance.

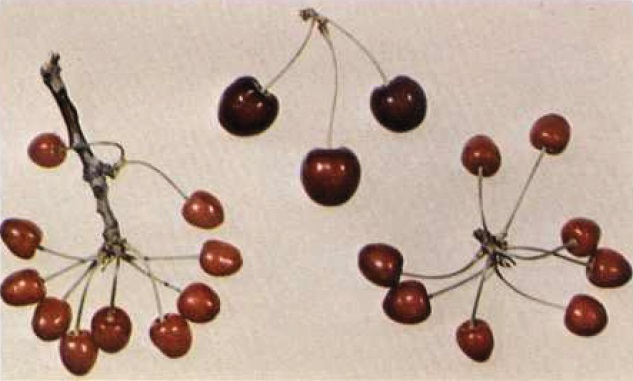
"Lambert cherry fruit affected by little cherry, left and right, showing smaller size, duller color, and angular and pointed shape, compared with normal Lambert fruit, center."

In infected trees of the commercially important cultivar Lambert, the fruit develops normally until about ten days before harvest, when maturation stops. At picking time, the cherries are 1/2–2/3 of the regular size, dull in color, with an angular pointed shape. The sugar and acid levels of the cherries are severely impacted, resulting in tasteless fruits, lacking both sweetness and flavor. Other cultivars show symptoms similar to those in Lambert, but usually less severe and more varied. Typically, dark-fruited cultivars show more severe fruit symptoms than cultivars with red or yellow fruit. The ability to recover is also dependent on cultivar, with some able to return to fruit sizes and coloring comparable to uninfected trees. The taste, however, never recovers.

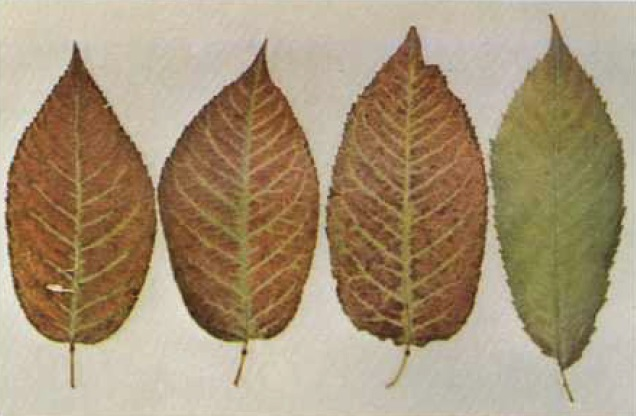
"Star cherry leaves affected by little cherry, showing red coloration in the areas between the main veins and the retention of green along the midrib and larger veins. Leaf on right is normal."

Some sweet cherry cultivars display foliage symptoms, with the fruit crop less hidden by the canopy, and leaf symptoms, varying from a slight marginal up-curl of the leaves to marked reddening of leaf surfaces. The general vigor of infected trees may be impaired, though this is not always apparent. Diagnosis of the disease can be assisted by RT-PCR assays.

Other Prunus species may act as symptomless or tolerant carriers of the disease; especially cultivars of Japanese flowering cherry (Prunus serrulata) have been implicated as such.

== Treatment ==
There is no known cure for little cherry disease and tolerance breeding programs have not yielded any cultivars able to withstand the effects of the disease for more than a few seasons. Thus, prevention of spread has been the focal point in combating the disease.

== The Kootenay outbreak ==
Little cherry disease was first identified in 1933 in the Kootenay region, British Columbia, where the economically important cherry industry was severely affected. Probably introduced to the region with ornamental cherry trees and spread by the large apple mealybug population in the area, the virus infected trees in almost all orchards. Over 30 000 trees were killed during the subsequent fifteen years after introduction and cherry production dropped from 680 000 kg in 1947 to 68 000 kg in 1979, when the last cherry packing line closed. Cherry production in the region resumed in 1996 after mandatory control programs had been put in place. In 1938, parasitic wasps were introduced to the area as biocontrol agents in an attempt to manage the apple mealy bug population, with some success in limiting the speed at which the viruses spread.
