= BYV (disambiguation) =

BYV is the approved acronym for the Beet yellows virus.

BYV may also refer to:

- Bykovaite, a silicate mineral (mineral symbol); see List of mineral symbols
- Beira Lake Seaplane Base, in Sri Lanka (IATA code); see List of airports by IATA airport code: B
- byv, ISO code for the Medumba language
