= Trialeurodes abutiloneus =

Scientific classification
- Domain: Eukaryota
- Kingdom: Animalia
- Phylum: Arthropoda
- Class: Insecta
- Order: Hemiptera
- Suborder: Sternorrhyncha
- Family: Aleyrodidae
- Genus: Trialeurodes
- Species: T. abutiloneus

Binomial name
- Trialeurodes abutiloneus (Haldeman, 1850)

Species of true bug

Trialeurodes abutiloneus or the banded-wing whitefly is a species of whitefly of the genus Trialeurodes first described by Haldeman in 1850.

Trialeurodes abutiloneus is a plant pest in its own right and a vector for Abutilon yellows virus and Sweet potato chlorotic stunt virus.
