= Grapevine leafroll-associated virus 2 =

Virus classification
- (unranked): Virus
- Realm: Riboviria
- Kingdom: Orthornavirae
- Phylum: Kitrinoviricota
- Class: Alsuviricetes
- Order: Martellivirales
- Family: Closteroviridae
- Genus: Closterovirus
- Species: Closterovirus vitis

Species of virus

Grapevine leafroll-associated virus 2 (GRLaV2) is a virus infecting grapevine in the genus Closterovirus. It is associated with rugose wood condition of grapevine. According to Bosciai, 1995, grapevine corky bark-associated virus (GCBaV) is a variant of GRLaV2.
