= Grapevine leafroll-associated virus 4 =

Virus classification
- (unranked): Virus
- Realm: Riboviria
- Kingdom: Orthornavirae
- Phylum: Kitrinoviricota
- Class: Alsuviricetes
- Order: Martellivirales
- Family: Closteroviridae
- Genus: Ampelovirus
- Species: Ampelovirus tetravitis

Species of virus

Grapevine leafroll-associated virus 4 (GRLaV-4) is a virus infecting grapevine in the genus Ampelovirus.
