= Velarivirus =

Virus classification
- (unranked): Virus
- Realm: Riboviria
- Kingdom: Orthornavirae
- Phylum: Kitrinoviricota
- Class: Alsuviricetes
- Order: Martellivirales
- Family: Closteroviridae
- Genus: Velarivirus

Genus of viruses

Velarivirus is a genus of viruses, in the family Closteroviridae. Plants serve as natural hosts. There are 11 species in this genus. Diseases associated with this genus include: GLRaV-7: symptomless in white-berried grapevine cultivar from Albania.

== Taxonomy ==
The following species are assigned to the genus, listed by scientific name and followed by their common names:

- Velarivirus agapanthi, Agapanthus velarivirus
- Velarivirus alphamali, Malus domestica virus A
- Velarivirus arecae, Areca palm velarivirus 1
- Velarivirus duocordylinae, Cordyline virus 2
- Velarivirus gembloutense, Pyrus virus A
- Velarivirus nanoavii, Little cherry virus 1
- Velarivirus oleae, Olive virus V
- Velarivirus septemvitis, Grapevine leafroll-associated virus 7
- Velarivirus tetracordylinae, Cordyline virus 4
- Velarivirus tricordylinae, Cordyline virus 3
- Velarivirus unicordylinae, Cordyline virus 1

== Structure ==
Viruses in the genus Velarivirus are non-enveloped, with filamentous geometries. These viruses are about 1500-1700 nm long. Genomes are linear, around 16-17kb in length. The genome codes for 10 proteins.

Genus	Structure	Symmetry	Capsid	Genomic arrangement	Genomic segmentation
Velarivirus	Filamentous		Non-enveloped	Linear	Monopartite

== Life cycle ==
Viral replication is cytoplasmic. Entry into the host cell is achieved by penetration into the host cell. Replication follows the positive stranded RNA virus replication model. Positive stranded RNA virus transcription is the method of transcription. The virus exits the host cell by tubule-guided viral movement. Plants serve as the natural host. Transmission routes are mechanical.

Genus	Host details	Tissue tropism	Entry details	Release details	Replication site	Assembly site	Transmission
Velarivirus	Plants	None	Viral movement; mechanical inoculation	Viral movement	Cytoplasm	Cytoplasm	Mechanical inoculation: insects
