= Lettuce infectious yellows virus =

Virus classification
- (unranked): Virus
- Realm: Riboviria
- Kingdom: Orthornavirae
- Phylum: Kitrinoviricota
- Class: Alsuviricetes
- Order: Martellivirales
- Family: Closteroviridae
- Genus: Crinivirus
- Species: Crinivirus lactucaflavi

Species of virus

Lettuce infectious yellows virus (LIYV) is a plant pathogenic virus of the family Closteroviridae.
