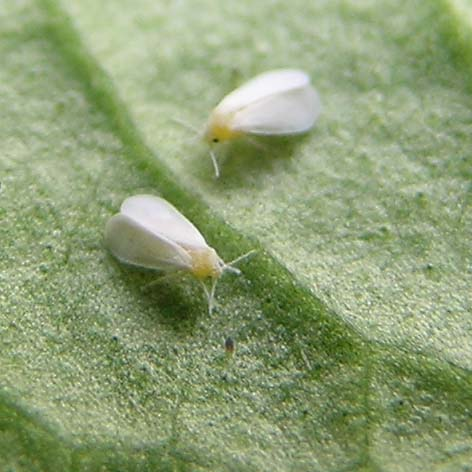
- Trialeurodes vaporariorum

Scientific classification
- Kingdom: Animalia
- Phylum: Arthropoda
- Class: Insecta
- Order: Hemiptera
- Suborder: Sternorrhyncha
- Family: Aleyrodidae
- Genus: Trialeurodes; Cockerell, 1902

= Trialeurodes =

Genus of true bugs

Trialeurodes is a large genus of whiteflies in the family Aleyrodidae.

== Species ==
63 accepted species

- Trialeurodes abdita Martin, 2005
- Trialeurodes abutiloneus (Haldeman, 1850) – banded-wing whitefly
- Trialeurodes amealcensis Carapia-Ruiz, 2003
- Trialeurodes asplenii (Maskell, 1890)
- Trialeurodes bambusae Takahashi, 1943
- Trialeurodes bellissima Sampson & Drews, 1940
- Trialeurodes bemisae Russell, 1948
- Trialeurodes bruneiensis Martin, 2001
- Trialeurodes celti Takahashi, 1943
- Trialeurodes chinensis Takahashi, 1955
- Trialeurodes coccolobae Russell, 1948
- Trialeurodes colcordae Russell, 1948
- Trialeurodes corollis Penny, 1922
- Trialeurodes cryptus Martin, 2005
- Trialeurodes darwiniensis Martin, 1999
- Trialeurodes dicksoniae Martin, 1999
- Trialeurodes diminutis Penny, 1922
- Trialeurodes drewsi Sampson, 1945
- Trialeurodes elaphoglossi Takahashi, 1960
- Trialeurodes ericae Bink-Moenen, 1976
- Trialeurodes eriodictyonis Russell, 1948
- Trialeurodes euphorbiae Russell, 1948
- Trialeurodes fernaldi Morrill, 1903
- Trialeurodes floridensis (Quaintance, 1900) – avocado whitefly
- Trialeurodes glacialis Bemis, 1904 – glacial whitefly
- Trialeurodes heucherae Russell, 1948
- Trialeurodes hutchingsi Bemis, 1904
- Trialeurodes intermedia Russell, 1948
- Trialeurodes ipomoeae Carapia-Ruiz, 2003
- Trialeurodes lauri (Signoret, 1882)
- Trialeurodes longispina Takahashi, 1943
- Trialeurodes madroni Bemis, 1904 – madrone whitefly
- Trialeurodes magnoliae Russell, 1948
- Trialeurodes mameti Takahashi, 1951
- Trialeurodes manihoti Bondar, 1923
- Trialeurodes meggitti Singh, 1933
- Trialeurodes merlini Bemis, 1904
- Trialeurodes mirissimus Sampson & Drews, 1941
- Trialeurodes multipori Russell, 1948
- Trialeurodes notata Russell, 1948
- Trialeurodes oblongifoliae Russell, 1948
- Trialeurodes packardi Morrill, 1903 – strawberry whitefly
- Trialeurodes palaquifolia Corbett, 1935
- Trialeurodes paucipapilla Martin, 2005
- Trialeurodes perakensis Corbett, 1935
- Trialeurodes pergandei (Quaintance, 1900); type species
- Trialeurodes phlogis Russell, 1993 – phlox whitefly
- Trialeurodes rex Martin, 2001
- Trialeurodes ricini Misra, 1924 – castor whitefly
- Trialeurodes ruborum (Cockerell, 1897)
- Trialeurodes sardiniae Rapisarda, 1986
- Trialeurodes shawundus Baker & Moles, 1921
- Trialeurodes similis Russell, 1948
- Trialeurodes tabaci Bondar, 1928
- Trialeurodes tentaculatus Bemis, 1904
- Trialeurodes tephrosiae Russell, 1948
- Trialeurodes thaiensis Takahashi, 1943
- Trialeurodes unadutus Baker & Moles, 1921
- Trialeurodes vaporariorum (Westwood, 1856) – greenhouse whitefly
- Trialeurodes varia Quaintance & Baker, 1937
- Trialeurodes variabilis (Quaintance, 1900) – papaya whitefly
- Trialeurodes vitrinellus Cockerell, 1903
- Trialeurodes vittatus (Quaintance, 1900) – grape whitefly
