= Ampelovirus =

Virus classification
- (unranked): Virus
- Realm: Riboviria
- Kingdom: Orthornavirae
- Phylum: Kitrinoviricota
- Class: Alsuviricetes
- Order: Martellivirales
- Family: Closteroviridae
- Genus: Ampelovirus

Genus of viruses

Ampelovirus is a genus of viruses, in the family Closteroviridae. Plants serve as natural hosts. There are 28 species in this genus. Diseases associated with this genus include: yellowing and necrosis, particularly affecting the phloem.

== Taxonomy ==
The following species are assigned to the genus, listed by scientific name and followed by the exemplar virus of the species:

- Ampelovirus allamandae, Allamanda chlorotic virus A
- Ampelovirus alphaolivae, Olive virus A
- Ampelovirus alpiniae, Alpinia vein clearing virus
- Ampelovirus bulbiferae, Air potato ampelovirus 1
- Ampelovirus croton, Croton golden spot associated virus A
- Ampelovirus dioscoreae, Yam asymptomatic virus 1
- Ampelovirus duananas, Pineapple mealybug wilt-associated virus 2
- Ampelovirus duesculentae, Manihot esculenta associated ampelovirus 2
- Ampelovirus duocitri, Citrus associated ampelovirus 2
- Ampelovirus hexananas, Pineapple mealybug wilt-associated virus 6
- Ampelovirus kaki, Persimmon ampelovirus
- Ampelovirus nanoavii, Little cherry virus 2
- Ampelovirus odontonemae, Firespike leafroll-associated virus
- Ampelovirus pentananas, Pineapple mealybug wilt-associated virus 5
- Ampelovirus perseae, Lingue ampelovirus 1
- Ampelovirus pistaciae, Pistachio ampelovirus A
- Ampelovirus pruni, Plum bark necrosis stem pitting-associated virus
- Ampelovirus sacchari, Sugarcane mild mosaic virus
- Ampelovirus septananas, Pineapple mealybug wilt-associated virus 7
- Ampelovirus tetravitis, Grapevine leafroll-associated virus 4
- Ampelovirus tredecimvitis, Grapevine leafroll-associated virus 13
- Ampelovirus triananas, Pineapple mealybug wilt-associated virus 3
- Ampelovirus trivitis, Grapevine leafroll-associated virus 3
- Ampelovirus unananas, Pineapple mealybug wilt-associated virus 1
- Ampelovirus unesculentae, Manihot esculenta associated ampelovirus 1
- Ampelovirus univitis, Grapevine leafroll-associated virus 1
- Ampelovirus unocitri, Citrus associated ampelovirus 1
- Ampelovirus venarubi, Blackberry vein banding-associated virus

== Structure ==
Viruses in the genus Ampelovirus are non-enveloped, with flexuous and Filamentous geometries. The diameter is around 10-13 nm, with a length of 1400-2200 nm. Genomes are linear, around 17.9kb in length. The genome codes for 13 proteins.

Genus	Structure	Symmetry	Capsid	Genomic arrangement	Genomic segmentation
Ampelovirus	Filamentous		Non-enveloped	Linear	Monopartite

== Life cycle ==
Viral replication is cytoplasmic. Entry into the host cell is achieved by penetration into the host cell. Replication follows the positive stranded RNA virus replication model. The virus exits the host cell by tubule-guided viral movement. Plants serve as the natural host. Transmission routes are mechanical.

Genus	Host details	Tissue tropism	Entry details	Release details	Replication site	Assembly site	Transmission
Ampelovirus	Plants	None	Viral movement; mechanical inoculation	Viral movement	Cytoplasm	Cytoplasm	Mechanical inoculation: insects
