= Aphanomyces cochlioides =

Scientific classification
- Domain: Eukaryota
- Clade: Sar
- Clade: Stramenopiles
- Phylum: Oomycota
- Class: Saprolegniomycetes
- Order: Saprolegniales
- Family: Leptolegniaceae
- Genus: Aphanomyces
- Species: A. cochlioides

Binomial name
- Aphanomyces cochlioides Drechsler, (1929)

Species of single-celled organism

Aphanomyces cochlioides is a plant pathogen that can affect commodity crops like spinach, Swiss chard, beets and related species. In spinach the pathogen is responsible for the black root "rot" that can damage plants.

Most commonly infection occurs on older roots that have already begun to grow, but if infection of a younger root occurs it can be identified by the excess growth of lateral roots- which is a common plant response to loss of the main taproot. Infection symptoms above ground will include chlorotic, non-vigorous, leaves that will not maintain turgor during the stress of hot sun, but will maintain the ability to revive during less stressful times such as cloudy days or overnight. To discern from other common beet revive during less stressful times such as cloudy days or overnight. To discern from other common beet diseases such as Rhizoctonia or Pythium root rot, leaves can be tested for brittleness or a burned or scorched appearance. It is also uncommon for a plant infected with Alternaria to become permanently wilted which is often the case in the previously mentioned pathogens. below ground root growth is often stunted as a result of lesions. The lesions have a water-soaked appearance and might be superficial. As the disease progresses down the stem and into the root the water-soaked spots will become darker as well as the interior of the root. An infected root will often have rotting around the tip leaving behind only vascular bundles, classifying it as a tip rot. If conditions for the plant are favorable it is possible for the crop to recover; however the root will still show signs of the infection such as dark spots, or scarring. There is an acute phase of the disease known as black root. This occurs April through June and will affect the younger plants. This can be especially devastating if warm, moist, conditions prevail in which seedlings can be destroyed within three to four days. The chronic phase, or root rot, occurs June through August in the latter part of the season in which the plants survived the first round of infection. This will be characterized by the wilt-recovery cycle of leaves and the root turning black from the inside out.

== Life cycle ==
The pathogen Aphanomycete cochlioides, like most oomycete fungi, survives and overwinter as oospores in plant debris or soil. When the soil warms in the spring the oospores receive signals to germinate. The oospores have the ability to directly infect the root in the soil but it is more common for the oospore to play a smaller role in the life cycle producing a specialized hyphae called sporangium. The sporangium has the ability to produce zoospores- which have two different types of flagella, tinsel and whiplash, that allow them to be motile in soil water. These motile spores will move on to infect a root in the soil. Throughout the season if conditions are warm and wet enough the sporangium will continue to make more zoospores which can go no to infect other roots. It is within an infected root that additional oospores will be produced to overwinter another season. Although disease develops in less heavy soils, a heavy textured soil is favorable as they tend to remain wetter. The same is true for low parts of fields, heavily compacted areas, or at the bottom of hills.

For early prevention of infection and to reduce the incidence of damping off, planting seeds that are at least partially resistant to Aphanomycete cochlioides is suggested. You can also purchase and plant seeds that have been treated with Hymexazol which is a fungicide that has been proven to be effective in preventing early infection. Cultural practices are some of the most beneficial in stopping the spread of the pathogen. It is important to reduce cross contamination from equipment and tools. Removing dead and diseased tissue as well as clearing the field at the end of the season can help lower the amount of inoculum present the next season. Utilizing soil tiling practices can help soil drainage, as well as planting in an area that will not stay wet for an extended amount of time. Rotating crops can decrease the overwintering structures still viable when the next rotation occurs. Planting when the soil is cool has been shown to help give the seedlings a head start on growth before sporulation is triggered by warming temperatures.
