= Beet distortion mosaic virus =

Virus classification
- Group: Group IV ((+)ssRNA)
- Family: Potyviridae
- Genus: Potyvirus
- Species: Beet distortion mosaic virus

Synonyms
- BtMV

Species of virus

Beet distortion mosaic virus is a plant pathogenic virus.
