= Puccinia subnitens =

Scientific classification
- Domain: Eukaryota
- Kingdom: Fungi
- Division: Basidiomycota
- Class: Pucciniomycetes
- Order: Pucciniales
- Family: Pucciniaceae
- Genus: Puccinia
- Species: P. subnitens

Binomial name
- Puccinia subnitens Dietel (1895)

Species of fungus

Puccinia subnitens is a fungal species and plant pathogen that causes rust on Beta vulgaris. It was originally found on Distichlis spicata in Montana, USA.

== See also ==
- List of Puccinia species
