= Beet leaf curl virus =

Beet leaf curl virus (BLCV)

Virus classification
- Group: Group V ((−)ssRNA)
- Family: Rhabdoviridae
- Genus: Nucleorhabdovirus
- Species: Beet leaf curl virus

Synonyms
- beet leaf crinkle virus beta virus 3 Rübenkr"usel-Virus sugarbeet leaf curl virus

Species of virus

Beet leaf curl virus (BLCV) is a plant pathogenic virus of the family Rhabdoviridae.

The host range for this virus includes species of Atriplex, Beta, Chenopodium and Spinacia and also Tetragonia tetragonioides. The most important hosts however are sugarbeet and fodder beet. BLCV is found in the Czech Republic, Germany, Poland, Slovakia, Slovenia and Turkey.

The vector for BCLV is Piesma quadratum, the beet lace bug. Both adults and nymphs acquire the virus when feeding continuously for at least thirty minutes and need to feed for at least forty minutes in order to inoculate the virus into new host plants. The vectors remains infective for the rest of their lives. The virus migrates to the salivary glands, haemolymph and intestinal wall and is thought to multiply in both the adult and larval stages of the insect. It does not seem to be transmissible mechanically or by seed. Dry plant material remains infectious for up to seven days and for twelve weeks at −20 °C.

The disease manifests itself by an initial translucence of the leaf veins and petioles which later become swollen and grow more slowly than the rest of the leaf causing it to crinkle. A bunch of small, curved new leaves form in the plant's crown creating a head somewhat resembling a lettuce. Growth in general slows down and the older leaves die. The disease is mostly found in central Europe in areas with light sandy soils. The loss of yield in sugarbeet can be up to 75% and the sugar content of the beets may be considerally reduced.
