= Beet yellows virus =

Virus classification
- (unranked): Virus
- Realm: Riboviria
- Kingdom: Orthornavirae
- Phylum: Kitrinoviricota
- Class: Alsuviricetes
- Order: Martellivirales
- Family: Closteroviridae
- Genus: Closterovirus
- Species: Closterovirus flavibetae

Species of virus

Beet yellows virus (BYV) is a plant pathogenic virus of the family Closteroviridae. Beet yellows virus is transmitted by multiple species of aphid and causes a yellowing disease in Beta vulgaris and Spinacia oleracea.

== See also ==
- Beet pseudoyellows virus
