= Closterovirus =

Virus classification
- (unranked): Virus
- Realm: Riboviria
- Kingdom: Orthornavirae
- Phylum: Kitrinoviricota
- Class: Alsuviricetes
- Order: Martellivirales
- Family: Closteroviridae
- Genus: Closterovirus

Genus of viruses

3'-terminal pseudoknot in BYV
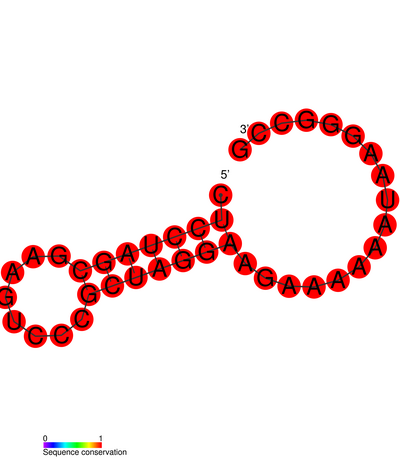
- Predicted secondary structure of the 3'-terminal pseudoknot in BYV

Identifiers
- Rfam: RF01100

Other data
- RNA type: Cis-reg
- Domain: Closterovirus
- PDB structures: PDBe

Closterovirus, also known as beet yellows viral group, is a genus of viruses, in the family Closteroviridae. Plants serve as natural hosts. There are 24 species in this genus. Diseases associated with this genus include: yellowing and necrosis, particularly affecting the phloem. This genus has a probably worldwide distribution and includes among other viral species the Beet yellows virus and Citrus tristeza virus, rather economically important plant diseases. At least some species require vectors such as aphids or mealybugs for their transmission from plant to plant.

== Taxonomy ==
The following species are assigned to the genus, listed by scientific name and followed by the exemplar virus of the species:

- Closterovirus alphafici, Fig virus A
- Closterovirus arracaciae, Arracacha virus 1
- Closterovirus betafici, Fig virus B
- Closterovirus carotae, Carrot closterovirus 1
- Closterovirus cnidi, Cnidium closterovirus 1
- Closterovirus dregeae, Dregea volubilis virus 1
- Closterovirus duocarotae, Carrot closterovirus 2
- Closterovirus flavibetae, Beet yellows virus
- Closterovirus flavicarotae, Carrot yellow leaf virus
- Closterovirus flavitritici, Wheat yellow leaf virus
- Closterovirus fragariae, Strawberry chlorotic fleck-associated virus
- Closterovirus macularubi, Raspberry leaf mottle virus
- Closterovirus menthae, Mint virus 1
- Closterovirus nanobetae, Beet yellow stunt virus
- Closterovirus necrodianthi, Carnation necrotic fleck virus
- Closterovirus rehmanniae, Rehmannia virus 1
- Closterovirus rosafolium, Rose leaf rosette-associated virus
- Closterovirus stellariae, Stellaria aquatica virus C
- Closterovirus tabaci, Tobacco virus 1
- Closterovirus thesii, Thesium chinense closterovirus 1
- Closterovirus tristezae, Citrus tristeza virus
- Closterovirus tritici, Wheat closterovirus 1
- Closterovirus uniribi, Blackcurrant closterovirus 1
- Closterovirus vitis, Grapevine leafroll-associated virus 2

== RNA pseudoknot ==
The viral RNA molecules of some members of this genus contain four hair-pin structures and a pseudoknot in the 3'UTR. These secondary structures have been found to be important in viral RNA replication.

== Life cycle ==
Viral replication is cytoplasmic. Entry into the host cell is achieved by penetration into the host cell. Replication follows the positive stranded RNA virus replication model. Positive stranded rna virus transcription is the method of transcription. The virus exits the host cell by tubule-guided viral movement. Plants serve as the natural host. Transmission routes are mechanical.

Genus	Host details	Tissue tropism	Entry details	Release details	Replication site	Assembly site	Transmission
Closterovirus	Plants	None	Viral movement; mechanical inoculation	Viral movement	Cytoplasm	Cytoplasm	Mechanical inoculation: insects

== Structure ==
Viruses in Closterovirus are non-enveloped, with flexuous and filamentous geometries. The diameter is around 10–13 nm, with a length of 1250–2200 nm. Genomes are linear, around 19.3kb in length.

Genus	Structure	Symmetry	Capsid	Genomic arrangement	Genomic segmentation
Closterovirus	Filamentous		Non-enveloped	Linear	Monopartite
