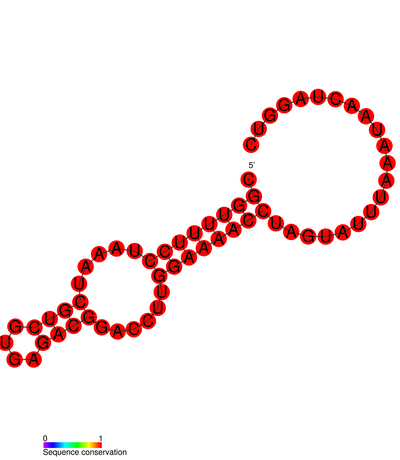

Virus classification
- (unranked): Virus
- Realm: Riboviria
- Kingdom: Orthornavirae
- Phylum: Kitrinoviricota
- Class: Alsuviricetes
- Order: Martellivirales
- Family: Closteroviridae

Genera
- See text

= Closteroviridae =

Family of viruses

Closteroviridae is a family of viruses. Plants serve as natural hosts. There are seven genera in this family. Diseases associated with this family include: yellowing and necrosis, particularly affecting the phloem.

== Taxonomy ==
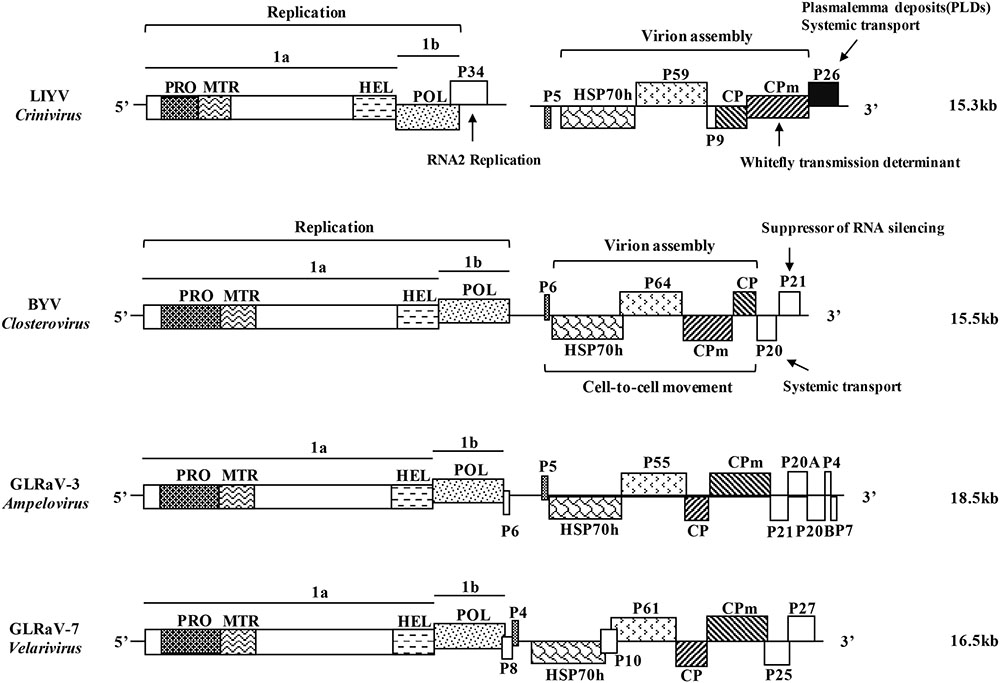
Schematic diagrams of the genome structure of the representative viruses in the four genera of the family Closteroviridae.

Genome type and transmission vector are two of the most important traits used for classification. Ampeloviruses and Closteroviruses have monopartite genomes and are transmitted by pseudococcid mealybugs (and soft scale insects) and aphids respectively. While Criniviruses are bipartite and transmitted by whiteflies.

The family contains the following genera:

- Ampelovirus
- Bluvavirus
- Closterovirus
- Crinivirus
- Menthavirus
- Olivavirus
- Velarivirus

== Structure ==
Viruses in the family Closteroviridae are non-enveloped, with flexuous and filamentous geometries. The diameter is around 10–13 nm, with a length of 950–2200 nm. Genomes are linear and non-segmented, bipartite, around 20kb in length.

== Life cycle ==
Viral replication is cytoplasmic. Entry into the host cell is achieved by penetration into the host cell. Replication follows the positive stranded RNA virus replication model. Positive stranded RNA virus transcription is the method of transcription. The virus exits the host cell by tubule-guided viral movement. Plants serve as the natural host. Transmission routes are mechanical.
