= List of Capsicum diseases =

This article is a list of diseases of Capsicum species.

== Bacterial diseases ==
Bacterial diseases
Bacterial spot	Xanthomonas campestris pv. vesicatoria
Bacterial wilt	Ralstonia solnacearum
Bacterial canker	Clavibacter michiganensis subsp. michiganensis
Syringae seedling blight and leaf spot	Pseudomonas syringae P. syringae pv. syringae
Crown Gall	Agrobacterium tumefaciens

== Fungal diseases ==
Fungal diseases
Anthracnose	Colletotrichum gloeosporioides Colletotrichum capsici Glomerella cingulata [teleomorph] Colletotrichum coccodes
Cercospora (frogeye) leaf spot	Cercospora capsici
Charcoal rot	Macrophomina phaseolina
Choanephora blight (wet rot)	Choanephora cucurbitarum
Damping-off and root rot	Rhizoctonia solani Phytophthora spp. Fusarium spp. Pythium spp.
Downy mildew	Peronospora tabacina
Fusarium stem rot	Fusarium solani
Fusarium wilt	Fusarium oxysporum f.sp. capsici
Gray leaf spot	Stemphylium solani Stemphylium lycopersici
Gray mold	Botrytis cinerea
Phytophthora blight	Phytophthora capsici
Powdery mildew	Oidiopsis sicula Oidiopsis taurica [synanamorph] Leveillula taurica [teleomorph]
Southern blight	Sclerotium rolfsii Athelia rolfsii [teleomorph]
Verticillium wilt	Verticillium albo-atrum Verticillium dahliae
White mold	Sclerotinia sclerotiorum

== Nematodes, parasitic ==
Nematodes, parasitic
Root knot	Meloidogyne incognita Meloidogyne hapla Meloidogyne javanica Meloidogyne arenaria
Sting nematode	Belonolaimus longicaudatus
Other nematodes	Paratrichodorus spp. Trichodorus spp. Pratylenchus penetrans Nacobbus aberrans Dolichodorus heterocephalus Helicotylenchus dihystera Hemicycliophora arenaria Radopholus similis

== Viral diseases ==
Viral diseases
Alfalfa mosaic	genus Alfamovirus, Alfalfa mosaic virus (AMV)
Andean potato mottle	genus Comovirus, Andean potato mottle virus-pepper strain (APMoV)
Beet curly top	genus Curtovirus, Beet curly top virus (BCTV)
Chili leaf curl	genus Begomovirus, Chili leaf curl virus (ChiLCV); Possibly strain of Tobacco leaf curl virus (TLCV)
Chilli veinal mottle	genus Potyvirus, Chilli veinal mottle virus (ChiVMV)
Chino del tomate	genus Begomovirus, Chino del tomate virus (CdTV)
Cucumber mosaic	genus Cucumovirus, Cucumber mosaic virus (CMV)
Pepper golden mosaic complex (previously Texas Pepper, Serrano Golden Mosaic, and Pepper Mild Tigre Viruses)	genus Begomovirus, Serrano golden mosaic virus (SGMV), Pepper mild tigre virus (PMTV), and others
Pepper huasteco	genus Begomovirus, Pepper huasteco virus (PHV)
Pepper leaf curl	genus Begomovirus, Pepper leaf curl virus (PepLCV)
Pepper mild mottle	genus Tobamovirus, Pepper mild mottle virus (PMMV)
Pepper mottle	genus Potyvirus, Pepper mottle virus (PepMoV)
Pepper veinal mottle	genus Potyvirus, Pepper veinal mottle virus (PVMV)
Potato virus Y	genus Potyvirus, Potato virus Y (PVY)
Sinaloa tomato leaf curl	genus Begomovirus, Sinaloa tomato leaf curl virus (TCLV)
Tobacco etch	genus Potyvirus, Tobacco etch virus (TEV)
Tobacco mosaic and Tomato mosaic	genus Tobamovirus, Tobacco mosaic virus (TMV) and Tomato mosaic virus (ToMV)
Tomato spotted wilt	genus Tospovirus, Tomato spotted wilt virus (TSWV)

== Post-harvest diseases ==
Postharverst diseases
Bacterial soft rot	Erwinia carotovora subsp. carotovora E. carotovora subsp. atroseptica E. chrysanthemi Pseudomonas spp.
Alternaria rot	Alternaria alternata
Botrytis fruit rot	Botrytis cinerea
Rhizopus rot	Rhizopus stolonifer

== Abiotic diseases ==
Abiotic diseases
Blossom-end rot	Deficiency of calcium in fruit
Sunscald	Exposure of fruit to sunlight and heat
