= Chilli leaf curl virus =

Virus classification
- (unranked): Virus
- Realm: Monodnaviria
- Kingdom: Shotokuvirae
- Phylum: Cressdnaviricota
- Class: Repensiviricetes
- Order: Geplafuvirales
- Family: Geminiviridae
- Genus: Begomovirus
- Species: Begomovirus chillicapsici

Species of virus

Chilli leaf curl virus (ChiLCV) is a DNA virus from the genus Begomovirus and the family Geminiviridae. ChiLCV causes severe disease especially in pepper (Capsicum spp.), but also affects other crops such as tomato (Solanum lycopersicum). It can be found in tropical and subtropical regions primarily in India, but has also been detected in countries such as Indonesia and Sri Lanka. This virus is transmitted by an insect vector from the family Aleyrodidae and order Hemiptera, the whitefly Bemisia tabaci. The primary host for ChiLCV are several Capsicum spp., but host species also include tomato and amaranth. ChiLCV has been responsible for several epidemics and causes severe economic losses. It is the focus of research trying to understand the genetic basis of resistance. Currently, a few sources of resistance have been discovered and used to breed resistant varieties.

== Genome ==
This virus typically consists of a single circular single-stranded (ss) DNA molecule (2.7 kb in size), and betasatellite (1361 nt in size), with some reports of bipartite genomes and alphasatellites. The betasatellite most associated with ChiLCLV in Capsicum was identified as Tomato leaf curl Bangladesh betasatellite (ToLCBDB). However, multiple betasatellites have been detected, and they likely play a role in symptom development. This virus has similar coat protein structure and genome organization to that of other begomoviruses such as TYLCV.

== Transmission ==
ChiLCV is transmitted by the insect vector Bemisia tabaci in a persistent-circulative nonpropagative manner. Transmission of the monopartite genome alone can lead to infection, but the presence of DNA A or DNA B helper viruses plays a large role in symptom development.

== Agricultural importance ==
The main symptoms are an upward curling, puckering, and bunching of leaves. The leaves are also reduced in size. Severely affected plants produce fewer, smaller, and deformed fruits. This virus can cause significant yield losses. In the case of mixed infections or pests such as thrips or mites, losses may be as severe as 90–100%, but typically range from 20-50%. Treatments that are commonly used for this disease include insecticides, removing infected plants, and growing varieties with genetic resistance.

== Epidemiology ==
ChiLCV is found in tropical and subtropical regions, and it significantly affects pepper production in India's major pepper growing regions. This virus was first detected in India around 1940, and later confirmed in the 1960s. There are closely related virus species including:

- Chilli leaf curl Bijnour virus
- Chilli leaf curl Palampur virus
- Chili leaf curl Salem virus
- Chili leaf curl Sri Lanka virus

ChiLCV is related to Pepper leaf curl virus (PepLCV), but it is a different species. Comparison of the sequence of ChiLCV with previously characterized begomoviruses shows it likely recombined with Papaya leaf curl virus and resulted in the new virus, PepLCV.

== Management ==
Currently, the most widespread treatments used to control the spread of ChiLCV are a wide range of insecticides. Rouging infected plants and destroying infected fields is also used when necessary. The usage of large quantities of insecticides to control vector populations is not ideal, and other cultural methods to control vector populations are of increasing importance to a complete integrated pest management strategy. Other strategies include producing resistant varieties through a transgenic, RNAi-mediated approach. Management by insecticides, imidacloprid 17.8 SL (0.003%) was most effective than spinosad 48 EC (0.02%), malathion 50 EC (0.05%), acephate 75 SP (0.1%) and methyl-demeton 25EC (0.025%). Management of chilli leaf curl was done by seed extract of plants and insecticides at different concentrations.
