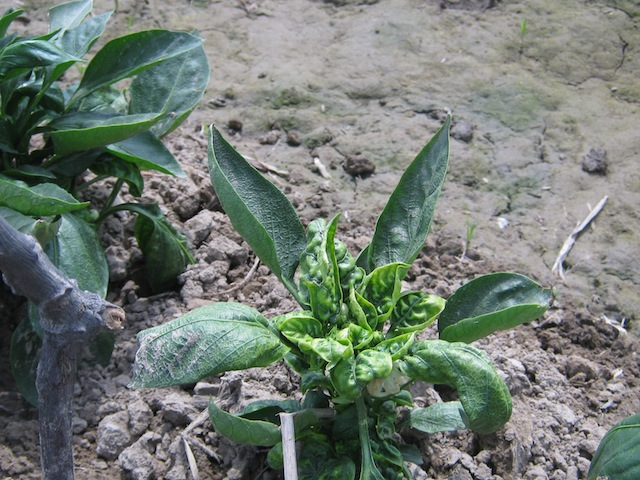
- Leaf curl virus

Virus classification
- (unranked): Virus
- Realm: Monodnaviria
- Kingdom: Shotokuvirae
- Phylum: Cressdnaviricota
- Class: Repensiviricetes
- Order: Geplafuvirales
- Family: Geminiviridae
- Genus: Begomovirus
- Species: Begomovirus capsici

= Pepper leaf curl virus =

Species of virus

Pepper leaf curl virus (PepLCV) is a DNA virus from the genus Begomovirus and the family Geminiviridae. PepLCV causes severe disease especially in pepper (Capsicum spp.). It can be found in tropical and subtropical regions such as Thailand and India, but has also been detected in countries such as the United States and Nigeria. This virus is transmitted by an insect vector from the family Aleyrodidae and order Hemiptera, the whitefly Bemisia tabaci. The primary host for PepLCV are several Capsicum spp.. PepLCV has been responsible for several epidemics and causes severe economic losses. It is the focus of research trying to understand the genetic basis of resistance. Currently, a source of resistance to the virus has been identified in the Bhut Jolokia pepper.

== Genome ==
This virus consists of a single circular single-stranded (ss) DNA molecule (2744 nt in size), and betasatellite, which is a common distinction among viruses in the family Geminiviridae. The betasatellite associated with PepLCLV in Capsicum was identified as Chili leaf curl betasatellite (ChLCB). This virus has similar coat protein structure and genome organization to that of other begomoviruses such as TYLCV.

== Transmission ==
PepLCV is transmitted by the insect vector Bemisia tabaci in a persistent-circulative nonpropagative manner. Transmission is most damaging when plants are infected at early growth stages, preventing the proper formation of flowers and pollen resulting in zero to low fruit production.

== Agricultural importance ==
Symptoms of PepLCV infection include severe stunting, flower bud abscission, reduction in pollen production, reduction of leaf size, upward cupping/curling of leaves, chlorosis on leaves and flowers, and reduction or elimination of fruit production. This virus can cause significant yield losses, and in the case of mixed infections or pests such as thrips or mites, losses may be as severe as 90–100%. Treatments that are commonly used for this disease include insecticides, border crops, and growing varieties with genetic resistance.

== Epidemiology ==
PepLCV is found in tropical and subtropical regions, and it significantly affects pepper production around the world. This virus was first detected in India around 1960, and now it occurs worldwide. PepLCV has been found in different countries from Africa, Asia, and Central and North America. There are closely related virus species including:

- Pepper leaf curl Bangladesh virus
- Pepper leaf curl Lahore virus
- Pepper leaf curl Yunnan virus

PepLCV is related to Chilli leaf curl virus (ChiLCV), but it is a different species. Comparison of the sequence of PepLCV with previously characterized begomoviruses shows it likely to have resulted from recombination between Papaya leaf curl virus and ChiLCV.

== Management ==
Currently, the most widespread treatments used to control the spread of PepLCV are insecticides and new resistant crop varieties. The usage of large quantities of insecticides to control vector populations is not ideal, and other cultural methods to control vector populations are of increasing importance to a complete integrated pest management strategy. Other methods to control the spread of PepLCV include planting resistant/tolerant lines, crop rotation, and border plantings.
