= Bean calico mosaic virus =

Virus classification
- (unranked): Virus
- Realm: Monodnaviria
- Kingdom: Shotokuvirae
- Phylum: Cressdnaviricota
- Class: Repensiviricetes
- Order: Geplafuvirales
- Family: Geminiviridae
- Genus: Begomovirus
- Species: Begomovirus phaseolicaliconis

Species of virus

Bean calico mosaic virus (BCaMV or BCMoV) is a plant virus transmitted by whiteflies that infects bean genera and species within the families Fabaceae, Malvaceae, and Solanaceae. Like other New World begomoviruses, its genome is bipartite, or having two parts. Phylogenetic analysis of its two genome segments, DNA-A and DNA-B, indicate the virus is from Sonora, Mexico, and shares a most recent common ancestor with the Leaf curl virus-E strain and the Texas pepper virus, both also found in the Sonora desert, and the Cabbage leaf curl virus from Florida.
