= Papaya leaf curl virus =

Virus classification
- (unranked): Virus
- Realm: Monodnaviria
- Kingdom: Shotokuvirae
- Phylum: Cressdnaviricota
- Class: Repensiviricetes
- Order: Geplafuvirales
- Family: Geminiviridae
- Genus: Begomovirus
- Species: Begomovirus caricae

Species of virus

Papaya leaf curl virus (PaLCuV) is a DNA virus from the genus Begomovirus and the family Geminiviridae. PaLCuV causes severe disease in papaya (Carica papaya), but can sometimes infect other crops such as tobacco or tomato. It can be found in tropical and subtropical regions primarily in India, but closely related species have also been detected in countries such as China, Malaysia, Nigeria and South Korea. This virus is transmitted by an insect vector from the family Aleyrodidae and order Hemiptera, the whitefly Bemisia tabaci. PaLCuV has been responsible for several epidemics and causes severe economic losses. Because of the broad diversity of these viruses, their characterization and control remains difficult.

== Genome ==
This virus typically consists of a bipartite circular single-stranded (ss) DNA molecule (2400–2800 nt in size), and betasatellite (1350-1400 nt in size). Several beta satellites are associated with PaLCuV, and they likely play a role in symptom development. Some alpha satellites have also been associated with PaLCuV. This virus has similar coat protein structure and genome organization to that of other begomoviruses such as TYLCV.

== Transmission ==
PaLCuV is transmitted by the insect vector Bemisia tabaci in a persistent-circulative nonpropagative manner. The wide range of host species, including several weeds plays a role in its broad transmission.

== Agricultural importance ==
The main symptoms are severe curling and thickening of veins on leaves. The plants are also reduced in size. Severely affected plants produce fewer, smaller, and deformed fruits. This virus can cause significant yield losses in orchards. Losses may be as severe as 90–100%, especially when other virus species such as Papaya ringspot virus (PRSV) are present. Treatments that are commonly used for this disease include insecticides and removing infected plants. There are no known varieties with genetic resistance at this time, but there are on-going efforts to discover and breed papaya with natural resistance.

== Epidemiology ==
PaLCuV is found in tropical and subtropical regions, and it significantly affects papaya production in India's major papaya growing regions. The disease was first described in 1939, while the causal virus was first detected in India in 1998. There are closely related virus species including:

- Papaya leaf crumple virus
- Papaya leaf curl China virus
- Papaya leaf curl Guandong virus

PaLCuV is related to Tomato leaf curl New Delhi virus (ToLCNDV), in some cases sharing 97% sequence identity.

== Management ==
Currently, the most widespread treatments used to control the spread of PaLCuV are a wide range of insecticides as well as crop rotation. Rouging infected plants and destroying infected fields is also used when necessary. The usage of large quantities of insecticides to control vector populations is not ideal, and other cultural methods to control vector populations are of increasing importance to a complete integrated pest management strategy. Other strategies include trying to engineer resistance through RNAi much like with the 'Rainbow' cultivar of papaya and PRSV.
