= Pepper mild tigré virus =

Virus classification
- (unranked): Virus
- Realm: Monodnaviria
- Kingdom: Shotokuvirae
- Phylum: Cressdnaviricota
- Class: Repensiviricetes
- Order: Geplafuvirales
- Family: Geminiviridae
- Genus: Begomovirus
- Species: incertae sedis
- Virus: Pepper mild tigré virus

Synonyms
- Pepper mild tigre virus; PMTV; Tigre disease virus

Member virus of Begomovirus

Pepper mild tigré virus (PepMTV) is a plant pathogenic virus of the family Geminiviridae. It was demoted from species status in 2002.
