= Clerodendrum golden mosaic China virus =

Virus classification
- (unranked): Virus
- Realm: Monodnaviria
- Kingdom: Shotokuvirae
- Phylum: Cressdnaviricota
- Class: Repensiviricetes
- Order: Geplafuvirales
- Family: Geminiviridae
- Genus: Begomovirus
- Species: Begomovirus clerodendrumchinaense

Species of virus

Clerodendrum golden mosaic China virus (ClGMCNV) is a bipartite Begomovirus isolated from flowering plants in the Clerodendrum genus. The virus causes yellow mosaic disease in various plant species, including Nicotiana, Petunia, Solanum, and Capsicum species. It is associated with a mosaic disease known as 'Dancing Flame'.
