= Tobacco leaf curl virus =

Tobacco leaf curl viruses

Scientific classification
- (unranked): Virus
- Realm: Monodnaviria
- Kingdom: Shotokuvirae
- Phylum: Cressdnaviricota
- Class: Repensiviricetes
- Order: Geplafuvirales
- Family: Geminiviridae
- Genus: Begomovirus

Groups included
- Tobacco leaf curl Cuba virus; Tobacco leaf curl Pusa virus; Tobacco leaf curl Thailand virus; Tobacco leaf curl Yunnan virus; Tobacco leaf curl Zimbabwe virus

Cladistically included but traditionally excluded taxa
- The other 404 species of Begomovirus

Group of several species of plant pathogenic viruses in the genus Begomovirus

Tobacco leaf curl viruses (TLCV) are several species of plant pathogenic viruses in the genus Begomovirus.
