= Ageratum yellow vein virus =

Virus classification
- (unranked): Virus
- Realm: Monodnaviria
- Kingdom: Shotokuvirae
- Phylum: Cressdnaviricota
- Class: Repensiviricetes
- Order: Geplafuvirales
- Family: Geminiviridae
- Genus: Begomovirus
- Species: Begomovirus ageravenae

Synonyms
- Soybean crinkle leaf virus

Species of virus

Ageratum yellow vein virus is a plant pathogenic virus of the family Geminiviridae.

In 2007 a unique strain was found on Guam.

== See also ==
- Soybean mosaic virus, a virus sometimes referred to as Crinkle.
