= Potato yellow mosaic virus =

Virus classification
- (unranked): Virus
- Realm: Monodnaviria
- Kingdom: Shotokuvirae
- Phylum: Cressdnaviricota
- Class: Repensiviricetes
- Order: Geplafuvirales
- Family: Geminiviridae
- Genus: Begomovirus
- Species: Begomovirus tuberosi

Species of virus

Potato yellow mosaic virus (PYMV) is a plant pathogenic virus of the family Geminiviridae.
