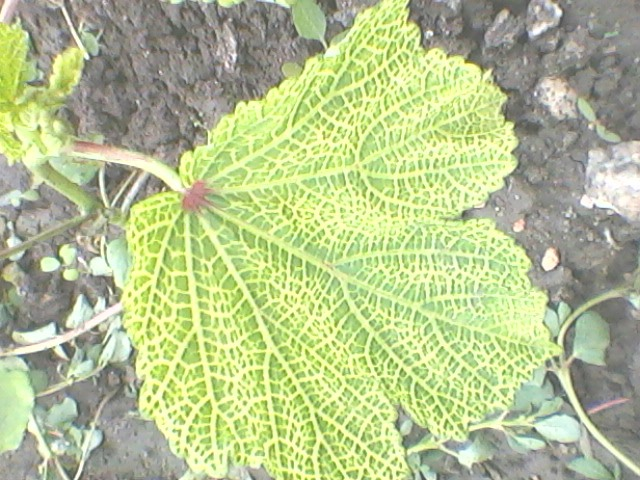
- Leaf of okra showing symptoms of Bhendi yellow vein mosaic

Virus classification
- (unranked): Virus
- Realm: Floreoviria
- Kingdom: Shotokuvirae
- Phylum: Cressdnaviricota
- Class: Repensiviricetes
- Order: Geplafuvirales
- Family: Geminiviridae
- Genus: Begomovirus
- Species: Begomovirus abelmoschusflavi

= Bhendi yellow vein mosaic virus =

Species of virus

Bhendi yellow vein mosaic virus (BYVMV) or okra yellow vein mosaic (OYVMV) is a viral disease caused by monopartite Begomovirus affecting okra plants. It was first found in 1924 in Bombay, India, and Sri Lanka. It is the major limitation of the production of okra. This disease is transmitted by whitefly.

== Taxonomy and genome ==
Bhendi yellow vein mosaic virus (BYVMV) is classified in the genus Begomovirus, family Geminiviridae. Like other begomoviruses, it possesses a circular, single-stranded DNA genome encapsidated in twinned icosahedral particles. Most isolates of BYVMV have a bipartite genome, designated DNA-A and DNA-B, each approximately 2.7 kilobases in length. Phylogenetically, BYVMV groups with other Old World begomoviruses infecting Malvaceae plants such as cotton and hibiscus.
