= Chino del tomate virus =

Virus classification
- (unranked): Virus
- Realm: Monodnaviria
- Kingdom: Shotokuvirae
- Phylum: Cressdnaviricota
- Class: Repensiviricetes
- Order: Geplafuvirales
- Family: Geminiviridae
- Genus: Begomovirus
- Species: Begomovirus solanumflavi

Synonyms
- Tomato leaf crumple virus

Species of virus

Chino del tomate virus (CdTV) is a plant pathogenic virus of the family Geminiviridae.
