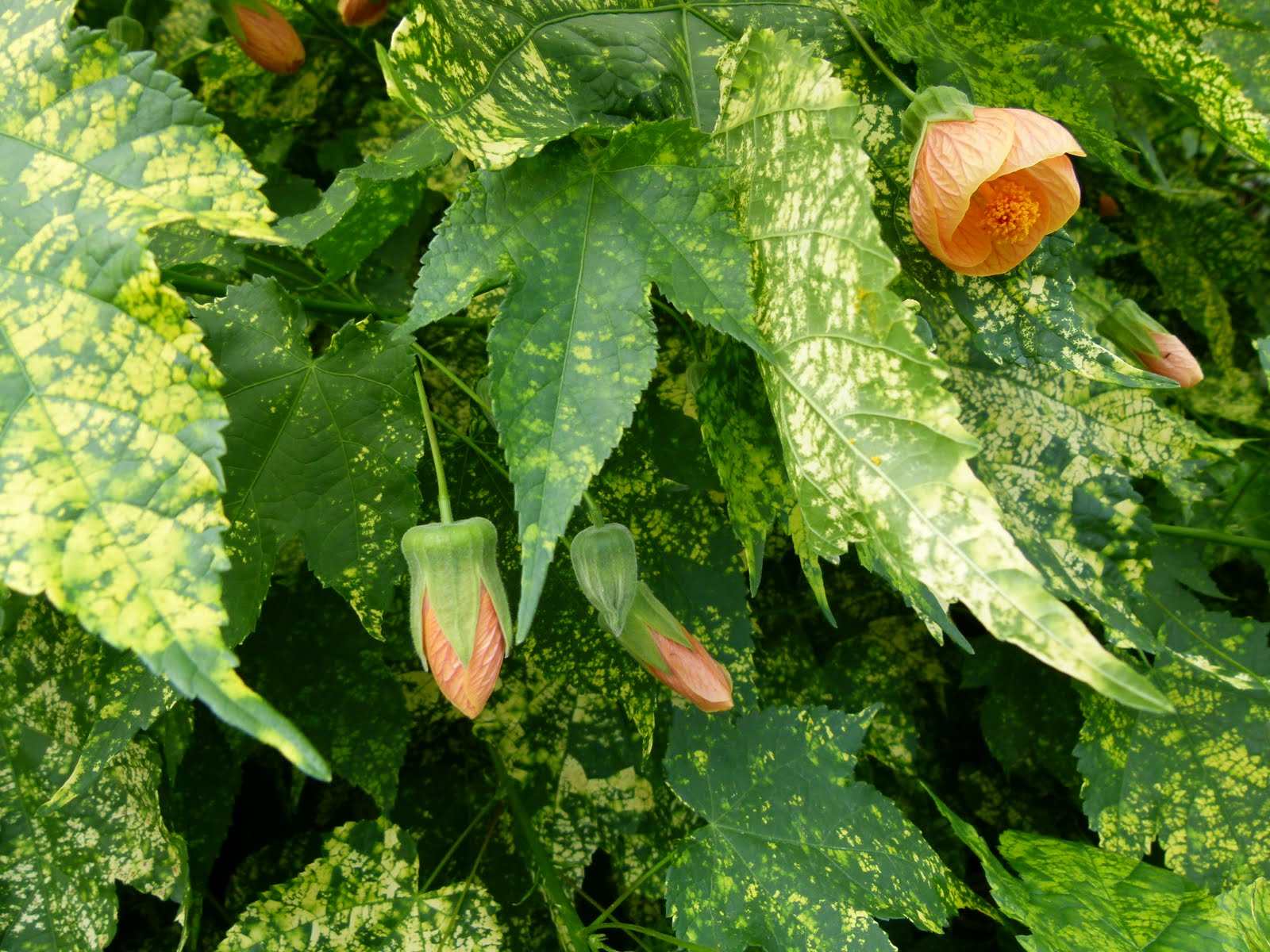
- Abutilon striatum showing mottled leaves

Virus classification
- (unranked): Virus
- Realm: Monodnaviria
- Kingdom: Shotokuvirae
- Phylum: Cressdnaviricota
- Class: Repensiviricetes
- Order: Geplafuvirales
- Family: Geminiviridae
- Genus: Begomovirus
- Species: Begomovirus bauri

= Abutilon mosaic virus =

Species of virus

Abutilon mosaic virus (AbMV) is a virus of the genus Begomovirus. It infects Abutilon species, notably the flowering maple, Abutilon striatum. The mottled or variegated effect on the leaves of Abutilon striatum is sought after.

== Host and symptoms ==
The host of the virus is Abutilon striatum, an upright, evergreen shrub. Foliage is three to five lobed and serrated with rich green color and mottling of yellow. Flowers are yellow-orange with crimson veins. The species is native to Brazil but has been naturalized in South and Central America.

Leaves become mottled with white or yellow mosaic that resembles variegation. The mottled patches are angular in appearance, and they are limited by veins. Some plants experience stunting, a decrease in photosynthetic potential caused by the reduction of chlorophyll, and they can dehydrate more readily. The symptoms are cosmetic in nature, so infection does not kill the plant, which will still be able to flower and reproduce even when infected.

== Disease cycle ==
The virus is naturally transmitted by the silverleaf whitefly, Bemisia tabaci. The virus can also be spread through contaminated tools and asexually propagated material. The virus is transmitted through the whitefly's digestive system, being transmitted as the insect feeds.

For the whitefly-to-plant life cycle, there is a 12-hour window, after the insect picks up the AbMV, during which the virus cannot be transmitted. This virus is transmitted to plants that the silverleaf whitefly feeds on after this time period.

Another mode for the AbMV to spread is manual transmission. This is seen in vegetative propagation of diseased material. For this particular disease, infected plants are chosen to be grafted or used as cuttings. The virus continues to live in the tissue after it is cut from the original plant for propagation. There are techniques to avoid manual transmission, such as sterilization of tools, but they are not used in Abutilon striatum propagation because the infected material is desired.

== Importance ==
The diseased plants are ornamentally desired. The mosaic symptom is considered more interesting than the healthy plant, and it is often marketed as a form of variegation. This disease was one of the first viruses described in scientific literature due to its ornamental properties. Horticulturalists were very interested in the diseases ability to create a variegated look without having to wait for a genetic mutation to pop up. For these reasons, there are no available controls. Propagators go out of their way to keep the virus intact in the new plants. AbMV is present throughout all of South America. As a member of the Geminiviridae family, AbMV is prone to genetic recombinations that could lead to a new variant with more serious consequence to Abutilon species or other plants.

== Strains ==
- Abutilon mosaic A, the West Indies virus strain
- Abutilon mosaic B, the Brazil virus strain
- Abutilon mosaic Hawaii virus
