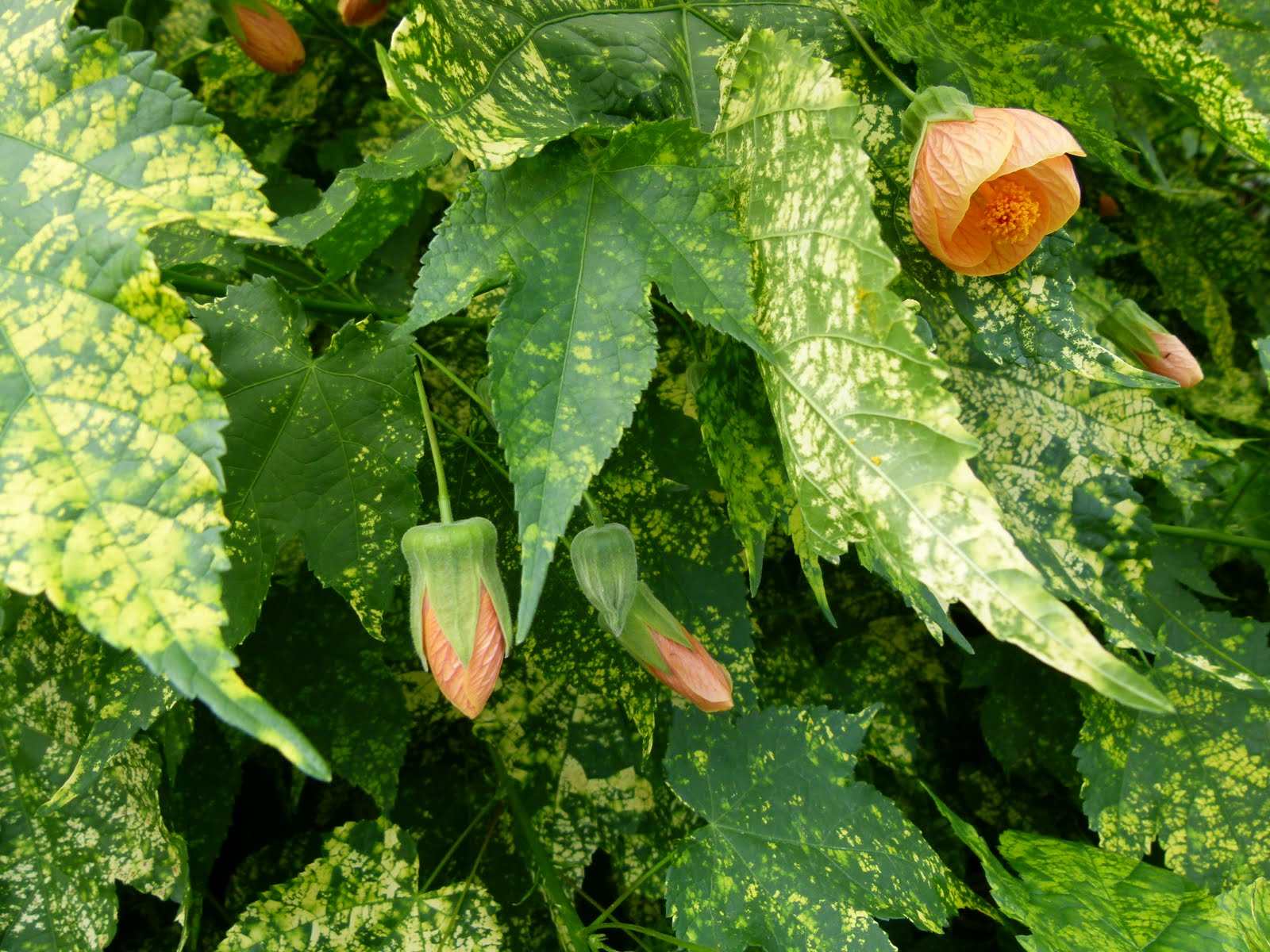
- Abutilon mosaic virus

Virus classification
- (unranked): Virus
- Realm: Floreoviria
- Kingdom: Shotokuvirae
- Phylum: Cressdnaviricota
- Class: Repensiviricetes
- Order: Geplafuvirales
- Family: Geminiviridae
- Genus: Begomovirus

Species
- See text

= Begomovirus =

Genus of viruses

Begomovirus is a genus of viruses, in the family Geminiviridae. They are plant viruses that as a group have a very wide host range, infecting dicotyledonous plants. Worldwide they are responsible for a considerable amount of economic damage to many important crops such as tomatoes, beans, squash, cassava and cotton. There are 466 species in this genus.

== Morphology ==
Virus particles are non-enveloped. The nucleocapsid is 38 nanometers (nm) long and 15–22 nm in diameter. While particles have basic icosahedral symmetry, they consist of two incomplete icosahedra—missing one vertex—joined. There are 22 capsomeres per nucleocapsid.

== Genome ==
The genome consists of a single stranded closed circular DNA. Many begomoviruses have a bipartite genome: this means that the genome is segmented into two segments (referred to as DNA A and DNA B) that are packaged into separate particles. Both segments are generally required for successful symptomatic infection in a host cell but DNA B is dependent for its replication upon DNA A, which can in some begomoviruses apparently cause normal infections on its own.

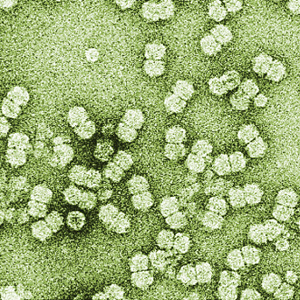
Begomovirus

The DNA A segment typically encodes five to six proteins including replication protein Rep, coat protein and transport and/or regulatory proteins. This component is homologous to the genomes of all other geminiviruses. The proteins encoded on it are required for replication (Rep), control of gene expression, overcoming host defenses, encapsidation (coat protein) and insect transmission. The DNA B segment encodes two different movement proteins. These proteins have functions in intra- and intercellular movement in host plants.

The A and B components share little sequence identity with the exception of a ~200 nucleotide sequence with typically >85% identity known as the common region. This region includes an absolutely conserved (among geminiviruses) hairpin structure and repeated sequences (known as 'iterons') that are the recognition sequences for binding of the replication protein (Rep). Within this loop there is a nonanucleotide sequence (TAATATTAC) that acts as the origin (ori) of virion strand DNA replication.

Component exchange (pseudorecombination) occurs in this genus. The usual mechanism of pseudorecombination is by a process known as 'regulon grafting': the A component donates its common region by recombination to the B component being captured. This results in a new dependent interaction between two components.

The proteins in this genus may lie either on the sense strand (positive orientation) or its complement (negative orientation).

=== Genes ===
- Segment A
  - V1 (R1)—positive orientation: Coat protein—29.7 kilodaltons (kDa)
  - V2—positive orientation: Movement protein (precoat ORF)—12.8 kDa
  - C1 (L1)—negative orientation: Replication initiation protein (Rep)—40.2 kDa
  - C2: (L2)—negative orientation: Transcription activator protein (TrAP)—19.6 kDa
  - C3: (L3)—negative orientation: Replication enhancer—15.6 kDa
  - C4:—negative orientation: May determine symptom expression—12.0 kDa
- Segment B
  - V1 (R1)—positive orientation: Nuclear shuttle protein—33.1 kDa
  - C1 (L1)—negative orientation: Movement protein—29.6 kDa

== Virology ==
Smaller than unit length virus components—deletion mutants—are common in infections. These are known as defective interfering (di) DNAs due to their capacity to interfere with virus infection. They reduce virus DNA levels and symptom severity.

== Phylogenetics ==
The two components of the genome have very distinct molecular evolutionary histories and likely to be under very different evolutionary pressures. The DNA B genome originated as a satellite that was captured by the monopartite progenitor of all extant bipartite begomoviruses and has subsequently evolved to become an essential genome component.

More than 133 begomovirus species having monopartite genomes are known: all originate from the Old World. No monopartite begomoviruses native to the New World have yet been identified.

Phylogenetic analysis is based on the A component. B components may be exchanged between species and may result in new species.

Analysis of the genus reveals a number of clades. The main division is between the Old and New World strains. The Old World strains can be divided into African, Indian, Japanese and other Asian clades with a small number of strains grouping outside these. The New World strains divide into Central and Southern America strains.

Along with these main groupings are a number of smaller clades. One group infecting a range of legumes originating from India and Southeast Asia (informally 'Legumovirus') and a set of viruses isolated from Ipomoea species originating from America, Asia and Europe (informally 'Sweepovirus') appear to be basal to all the other species. Two species isolated from Corchorus from Vietnam (informally 'Corchovirus') somewhat unexpectedly group with the New World species.

== Transmission ==
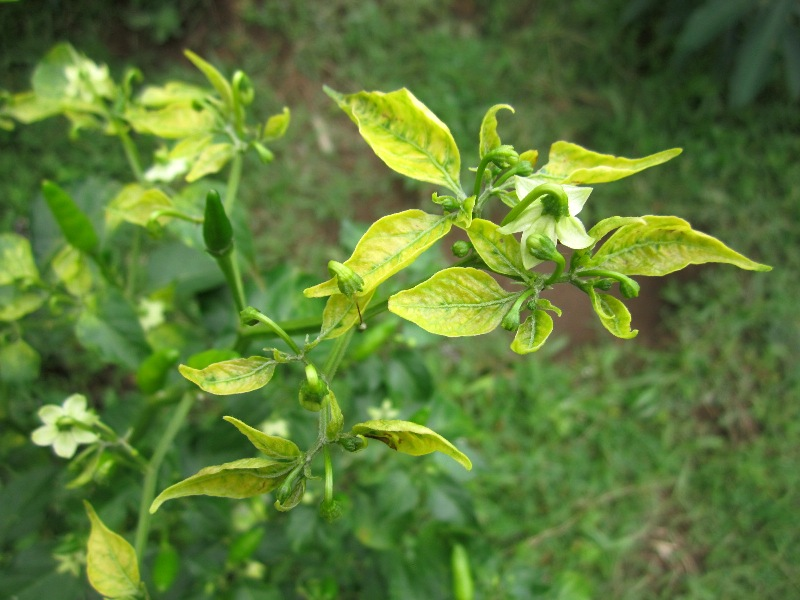
Symptom of pepper yellow leaf curl virus

The virus is obligately transmitted by an insect vector, which can be the whitefly Bemisia tabaci or can be other whiteflies. This vector allows rapid and efficient propagation of the virus because it is an indiscriminate feeder. The vector transmits in a persistent, circulative, non-propagative manner.

This USDA document describes a 5-year plan starting in 1992 to mitigate whiteflies.

== Diseases ==
Several begomoviruses cause severe diseases all over the world. Those begomovirus species infecting tomato such as Tomato yellow leaf curl virus (TYLCV) and Tomato yellow mosaic virus (ToYMV), first identified in the late 1980s, cause significant economic losses worldwide. In countries where these viruses have become widespread such as Trinidad, the Dominican Republic, Mexico and much of Central America, Israel, as well as across Southeast Asia including Thailand, Cambodia, Indonesia, and India, these diseases in tomato and other crops including pepper, and eggplant, can cause an estimated yield loss of 50–60%. Begomoviruses infecting pepper (Capsicum spp.) such as Pepper leaf curl virus and Chilli leaf curl virus also cause significant losses worldwide. Disease is typically manifested in the infected plant as chlorosis, leaf distortion, flower bud absicion and crinkling and stunting. In countries where these viruses have become widespread across Southeast Asia including Thailand, Cambodia, Indonesia, Sri Lanka, and India, these diseases in pepper and other crops including tomato, cucumber, pumpkin, melon, and eggplant, can cause an estimated yield loss of 40–70%. Bean golden yellow mosaic virus (BGYMV) causes a serious disease in bean species within Central America, the Caribbean and southern Florida.

== Species ==
The genus contains the following species, listed by scientific name and followed by the exemplar virus of the species:

- Begomovirus abelmoschusbhubhaneswarense, Bhendi yellow vein Bhubhaneswar virus
- Begomovirus abelmoschusdehliense, Bhendi yellow vein mosaic Delhi virus
- Begomovirus abelmoschusflavi, Bhendi yellow vein mosaic virus
- Begomovirus abelmoschusharyanaense, Bhendi yellow vein Haryana virus
- Begomovirus abelmoschusenation, Okra enation leaf curl virus
- Begomovirus abelmoschusmaculae, Okra mottle virus
- Begomovirus abelmoschusmexicoense, Okra yellow mosaic Mexico virus
- Begomovirus abelmoschusomanense, Okra leaf curl Oman virus
- Begomovirus abelmoschusretorridi, Okra yellow crinkle virus
- Begomovirus abutilonbrazilense, Abutilon mosaic Brazil virus
- Begomovirus abutilonis, Abutilon golden mosaic virus
- Begomovirus agerahualianense, Ageratum yellow vein Hualian virus
- Begomovirus agerainvolutionis, Ageratum leaf curl virus
- Begomovirus agerasichuanense, Ageratum leaf curl Sichuan virus
- Begomovirus agerasrilankaense, Ageratum yellow vein Sri Lanka virus
- Begomovirus agerati, Ageratum enation virus
- Begomovirus ageravenae, Ageratum yellow vein virus
- Begomovirus alceacrispi, Hollyhock vein yellowing virus
- Begomovirus alceae, Hollyhock leaf curl virus
- Begomovirus alceamuvisi, Hollyhock yellow vein mosaic virus
- Begomovirus alceavenae, Hollyhock yellow vein virus
- Begomovirus allamandae, Allamanda leaf curl virus
- Begomovirus alternantherae, Alternanthera yellow vein virus
- Begomovirus andrographis, Andrographis yellow vein leaf curl virus
- Begomovirus asystasiae, Asystasia mosaic Madagascar virus
- Begomovirus asystasiaprimi, West African Asystasia virus 1
- Begomovirus asystasiasecundi, West African Asystasia virus 2
- Begomovirus asystasiatertii, West African Asystasia virus 3
- Begomovirus bauri, Abutilon mosaic virus
- Begomovirus bemisiaprimi, Whitefly-associated begomovirus 1
- Begomovirus bemisiaquarti, Whitefly-associated begomovirus 4
- Begomovirus bemisiasecundi, Whitefly-associated begomovirus 2
- Begomovirus bemisiaseptimi, Whitefly-associated begomovirus 7
- Begomovirus bemisiasexti, Whitefly-associated begomovirus 6
- Begomovirus bemisiatertii, Whitefly-associated begomovirus 3
- Begomovirus birdi, Bean golden yellow mosaic virus
- Begomovirus blainvilleae, Blainvillea yellow spot virus
- Begomovirus blechi, Blechum interveinal chlorosis virus
- Begomovirus blechumflavi, Blechum yellow vein virus
- Begomovirus boerhaviae, Boerhavia yellow spot virus
- Begomovirus brassicae, Cabbage leaf curl virus
- Begomovirus brassicajamaicaense, Cabbage leaf curl Jamaica virus
- Begomovirus caboniensis, Cnidoscolus mild mosaic virus
- Begomovirus cajani, Cajanus scarabaeoides yellow mosaic virus
- Begomovirus caprariae, Capraria yellow spot virus
- Begomovirus capsiahmedbadense, Chilli leaf curl Ahmedabad virus
- Begomovirus capsibhavanisagarense, Chilli leaf curl Bhavanisagar virus
- Begomovirus capsici, Pepper leaf curl virus
- Begomovirus capsicumacehense, Pepper yellow leaf curl Aceh virus
- Begomovirus capsicumannui, Pepper blistering leaf virus
- Begomovirus capsicumbangladeschense, Pepper leaf curl Bangladesh virus
- Begomovirus capsicumchinaense, Pepper yellow leaf curl virus
- Begomovirus capsicumcontorsioris, Pepper leafroll virus
- Begomovirus capsicumhuastecoense, Pepper huasteco yellow vein virus
- Begomovirus capsicumindonesiaense, Pepper yellow leaf curl Indonesia virus
- Begomovirus capsicumindonesiaenseduo, Pepper yellow leaf curl Indonesia virus 2
- Begomovirus capsicumlahorense, Pepper leaf curl Lahore virus
- Begomovirus capsicummaliense, Pepper yellow vein Mali virus
- Begomovirus capsicummusivi, Pepper golden mosaic virus
- Begomovirus capsicumthailandense, Pepper yellow leaf curl Thailand virus
- Begomovirus capsicumyunnanense, Pepper leaf curl Yunnan virus
- Begomovirus capsigondaense, Chilli leaf curl Gonda virus
- Begomovirus capsikanpurense, Chilli leaf curl Kanpur virus
- Begomovirus capsindiaense, Chilli leaf curl India virus
- Begomovirus capsisrilankaense, Chilli leaf curl Sri Lanka virus
- Begomovirus capsivellanadense, Chilli leaf curl Vellanad virus
- Begomovirus caricachinaense, Papaya leaf curl China virus
- Begomovirus caricae, Papaya leaf curl virus
- Begomovirus caricaflavi, Papaya yellow leaf curl virus
- Begomovirus caricaguandongense, Papaya leaf curl Guandong virus
- Begomovirus caricaprimi, Papaya severe leaf curl virus 1
- Begomovirus caricasecundi, Papaya severe leaf curl virus 2
- Begomovirus catharanthi, Catharanthus yellow mosaic virus
- Begomovirus catharticae, Allamanda leaf mottle distortion virus
- Begomovirus centrosemae, Centrosema yellow spot virus
- Begomovirus chayotis, Chayote yellow mosaic virus
- Begomovirus chenopodii, Chenopodium leaf curl virus
- Begomovirus chillicapsici, Chilli leaf curl virus
- Begomovirus chlorocucumis, Melon chlorotic leaf curl virus
- Begomovirus chuxiongense, Tomato leaf curl Chuxiong virus
- Begomovirus citharexyli, Citharexylum leaf curl virus
- Begomovirus citrulli, Watermelon chlorotic stunt virus
- Begomovirus cleomaurei, Cleome golden mosaic virus
- Begomovirus cleomecrispi, Cleome leaf crumple virus
- Begomovirus clerodendronflavi, Clerodendron yellow mosaic virus
- Begomovirus clerodendronis, Clerodendron golden mosaic virus
- Begomovirus clerodendrumchinaense, Clerodendrum golden mosaic China virus
- Begomovirus clerodendrumjiangsuense, Clerodendrum golden mosaic Jiangsu virus
- Begomovirus clitoriae, Butterfly pea yellow mosaic virus
- Begomovirus cnidoscoli, Cnidoscolus mosaic leaf deformation virus
- Begomovirus cocciniae, Coccinia mosaic Tamil Nadu virus
- Begomovirus coheni, Tomato yellow leaf curl virus
- Begomovirus corchocubaense, Corchorus yellow vein Cuba virus
- Begomovirus corchoflavi, Corchorus yellow spot virus
- Begomovirus corchomusivi, Corchorus yellow vein mosaic virus
- Begomovirus corchori, Corchorus golden mosaic virus
- Begomovirus corchovenae, Corchorus yellow vein virus
- Begomovirus costai, Bean golden mosaic virus
- Begomovirus crassocephali, Crassocephalum yellow vein virus
- Begomovirus crotalariae, Sunn hemp leaf distortion virus
- Begomovirus crotoflavi, Croton yellow vein mosaic virus
- Begomovirus crotomusivi, Croton golden mosaic virus
- Begomovirus cucumis, Cucumber chlorotic leaf virus
- Begomovirus cucumisflavi, Melon yellow mosaic virus
- Begomovirus cucumismusivi, Melon chlorotic mosaic virus
- Begomovirus cucurbitachinaense, Squash leaf curl China virus
- Begomovirus cucurbitae, Cucurbit leaf crumple virus
- Begomovirus cucurbitamaximae, Pumpkin yellow mosaic virus
- Begomovirus cucurbitapeponis, Squash leaf curl virus
- Begomovirus cucurbitaphilippinense, Squash leaf curl Philippines virus
- Begomovirus cucurbitatenuis, Squash mild leaf curl virus
- Begomovirus cucurbitayunnanense, Squash leaf curl Yunnan virus
- Begomovirus dalechampiae, Dalechampia chlorotic mosaic virus
- Begomovirus daturadistortionis, Datura leaf distortion virus
- Begomovirus daturae, Datura leaf curl virus
- Begomovirus deinbolliae, Deinbollia mosaic virus
- Begomovirus desmodii, Desmodium mottle virus
- Begomovirus desmodistortionis, Desmodium leaf distortion virus
- Begomovirus diclipteracubaense, Dicliptera yellow mottle Cuba virus
- Begomovirus diclipterae, Dicliptera yellow mottle virus
- Begomovirus dolichoris, Dolichos yellow mosaic virus
- Begomovirus durantae, Duranta leaf curl virus
- Begomovirus ecliptae, Eclipta yellow vein virus
- Begomovirus emiliae, Emilia yellow vein virus
- Begomovirus emiliafujianense, Emilia yellow vein Fujian virus
- Begomovirus emiliathailandense, Emilia yellow vein Thailand virus
- Begomovirus erectitesis, Erectites yellow mosaic virus
- Begomovirus eupatorii, Eupatorium yellow vein virus
- Begomovirus euphorbiae, Euphorbia leaf curl virus
- Begomovirus euphorbiaflavi, Euphorbia yellow leaf curl virus
- Begomovirus euphorbiaguangxiense, Euphorbia leaf curl Guangxi virus
- Begomovirus euphorbiamusivi, Euphorbia mosaic virus
- Begomovirus euphorbiamusiviflavi, Euphorbia yellow mosaic virus
- Begomovirus euphorbiaperuense, Euphorbia mosaic Peru virus
- Begomovirus flavintervenae, Tomato interveinal yellowing virus
- Begomovirus galii, Galium leaf distortion virus
- Begomovirus glycinepallidi, Soybean chlorotic blotch virus
- Begomovirus glycinevariati, Soybean mild mottle virus
- Begomovirus glycinis, Soybean blistering mosaic virus
- Begomovirus gossypialabadense, Cotton leaf curl Alabad virus
- Begomovirus gossypibangalorense, Cotton leaf curl Bangalore virus
- Begomovirus gossypibarasatense, Cotton leaf curl Barasat virus
- Begomovirus gossypiflavi, Cotton yellow mosaic virus
- Begomovirus gossypigeziraense, Cotton leaf curl Gezira virus
- Begomovirus gossypii, Cotton leaf crumple virus
- Begomovirus gossypikokranense, Cotton leaf curl Kokhran virus
- Begomovirus gossypimaculae, Cotton chlorotic spot virus
- Begomovirus gossypimultanense, Cotton leaf curl Multan virus
- Begomovirus hedyotis, Hedyotis uncinella yellow mosaic virus
- Begomovirus hemidesmi, Hemidesmus yellow mosaic virus
- Begomovirus hibisci, Hibiscus golden mosaic virus
- Begomovirus hibiscusvenae, Hibiscus yellow vein leaf curl virus
- Begomovirus hortuscrotoni, Garden croton enation leaf curl virus
- Begomovirus hybanthi, Hybanthus yellow mosaic virus
- Begomovirus hyptidis, Hyptis golden mosaic virus
- Begomovirus ipomoeacanaryense, Sweet potato leaf curl Canary virus
- Begomovirus ipomoeachinaense, Sweet potato leaf curl China virus
- Begomovirus ipomoeae, Sweet potato leaf curl virus
- Begomovirus ipomoeageorgiaense, Sweet potato leaf curl Georgia virus
- Begomovirus ipomoeaguangxiense, Sweet potato leaf curl Guangxi virus
- Begomovirus ipomoeahenanense, Sweet potato leaf curl Henan virus
- Begomovirus ipomoeahubeiense, Sweet potato leaf curl Hubei virus
- Begomovirus ipomoeakoreaense, Sweet potato golden Korea vein virus
- Begomovirus ipomoeamusivi, Sweet potato mosaic virus
- Begomovirus ipomoeasaopauloense, Sweet potato leaf curl Sao Paulo virus
- Begomovirus ipomoeashandongense, Sweet potato leaf curl Shandong virus
- Begomovirus ipomoeasichuanprimi, Sweet potato leaf curl Sichuan virus 1
- Begomovirus ipomoeasichuansecundi, Sweet potato leaf curl Sichuan virus 2
- Begomovirus ipomoeasouthcarolinaense, Sweet potato leaf curl South Carolina virus
- Begomovirus jacquemontiamusivi, Jacquemontia yellow mosaic virus
- Begomovirus jacquemontiavenae, Jacquemontia yellow vein virus
- Begomovirus jacquemontiayucatanense, Jacquemontia mosaic Yucatan virus
- Begomovirus jatrophae, Jatropha leaf curl virus
- Begomovirus jatrophaflavamusivi, Jatropha yellow mosaic virus
- Begomovirus jatrophaflavi, Jatropha leaf yellow mosaic virus
- Begomovirus jatrophagujaratense, Jatropha leaf curl Gujarat virus
- Begomovirus jatrophagunturense, Jatropha leaf curl Guntur virus
- Begomovirus jatrophaindiaense, Jatropha mosaic India virus
- Begomovirus jatrophamusivi, Jatropha mosaic virus
- Begomovirus jatrophanigeriaense, Jatropha mosaic Nigeria virus
- Begomovirus jeskei, Abutilon mosaic Bolivia virus
- Begomovirus kokenae, Eupatorium yellow vein mosaic virus
- Begomovirus leonuri, Leonurus mosaic virus
- Begomovirus linderniae, Lindernia anagallis yellow vein virus
- Begomovirus lisianthi, Lisianthus enation leaf curl virus
- Begomovirus loniceramusivi, Horsegram yellow mosaic virus
- Begomovirus ludwigiae, Ludwigia yellow vein virus
- Begomovirus ludwigiavietnamense, Ludwigia yellow vein Vietnam virus
- Begomovirus luffae, Luffa yellow mosaic virus
- Begomovirus lycianthesis, Lycianthes yellow mosaic virus
- Begomovirus macroptilaurei, Macroptilium golden mosaic virus
- Begomovirus macroptilicommunis, Macroptilium common mosaic virus
- Begomovirus macroptilifloridaense, Macroptilium yellow mosaic Florida virus
- Begomovirus macroptilii, Macroptilium yellow mosaic virus
- Begomovirus macroptilimaculae, Macroptilium yellow spot virus
- Begomovirus macroptilimusivi, Macroptilium bright mosaic virus
- Begomovirus macroptilipuertoricoense, Macroptilium mosaic Puerto Rico virus
- Begomovirus macroptilivenae, Macroptilium yellow vein virus
- Begomovirus macrotylomae, Honeysuckle yellow vein virus
- Begomovirus malvastri, Malvastrum leaf curl virus
- Begomovirus malvastrumcambodiaense, Malvastrum yellow vein Cambodia virus
- Begomovirus malvastrumflavi, Malvastrum bright yellow mosaic virus
- Begomovirus malvastrumhelshirense, Malvastrum yellow mosaic Helshire virus
- Begomovirus malvastrumhonghense, Malvastrum yellow vein Honghe virus
- Begomovirus malvastrumjamaicaense, Malvastrum yellow mosaic Jamaica virus
- Begomovirus malvastrumlahorense, Malvastrum yellow vein Lahore virus
- Begomovirus malvastrummusivi, Malvastrum yellow mosaic virus
- Begomovirus malvastrumphilipinesense, Malvastrum leaf curl Philippines virus
- Begomovirus malvastrumyunnanense, Malvastrum yellow vein Yunnan virus
- Begomovirus malvatrumvenae, Malvastrum yellow vein virus
- Begomovirus manihotis, African cassava mosaic virus
- Begomovirus manihotisafricaense, East African cassava mosaic virus
- Begomovirus manihotisburkinafasoense, African cassava mosaic Burkina Faso virus
- Begomovirus manihotiscameroonense, East African cassava mosaic Cameroon virus
- Begomovirus manihotisindianense, Indian cassava mosaic virus
- Begomovirus manihotiskenyaense, East African cassava mosaic Kenya virus
- Begomovirus manihotismadagascarense, Cassava mosaic Madagascar virus
- Begomovirus manihotismalawiense, East African cassava mosaic Malawi virus
- Begomovirus manihotiszanzibarense, East African cassava mosaic Zanzibar virus
- Begomovirus melochiae, Melochia mosaic virus
- Begomovirus melochiaflavi, Melochia yellow mosaic virus
- Begomovirus melochiasecundi, Melochia associated virus
- Begomovirus merremiae, Merremia mosaic virus
- Begomovirus merremiapuertoricoense, Merremia mosaic Puerto Rico virus
- Begomovirus mestae, Mesta yellow vein mosaic Bahraich virus
- Begomovirus mimosae, Mimosa yellow leaf curl virus
- Begomovirus mirabilis, Mirabilis leaf curl virus
- Begomovirus momordicae, Bitter gourd yellow mosaic virus
- Begomovirus moralesi, Bean dwarf mosaic virus
- Begomovirus mucunae, Velvet bean severe mosaic virus
- Begomovirus mucunaflavi, Velvet bean golden mosaic virus
- Begomovirus muntiflavi, Muntingia yellow spot virus
- Begomovirus myanmarense, Tobacco curly shoot Myanmar virus
- Begomovirus nicotianacomorosense, Tobacco leaf curl Comoros virus
- Begomovirus nicotianacubaense, Tobacco leaf curl Cuba virus
- Begomovirus nicotianadominicanense, Tobacco leaf curl Dominican Republic virus
- Begomovirus nicotianae, Tobacco curly shoot virus
- Begomovirus nicotianaparvi, Tobacco yellow crinkle virus
- Begomovirus nicotianapusaense, Tobacco leaf curl Pusa virus
- Begomovirus nicotianarugosi, Tobacco leaf rugose virus
- Begomovirus nicotianathailandense, Tobacco leaf curl Thailand virus
- Begomovirus nicotianavariati, Tobacco mottle leaf curl virus
- Begomovirus nicotianayunnanense, Tobacco leaf curl Yunnan virus
- Begomovirus nicotianazimbabwense, Tobacco leaf curl Zimbabwe virus
- Begomovirus ocimumaurei, Ocimum golden mosaic virus
- Begomovirus ocimummusivi, Ocimum mosaic virus
- Begomovirus ocimumvenae, Ocimum yellow vein virus
- Begomovirus oxalisflavi, Oxalis yellow vein virus
- Begomovirus papayae, Papaya leaf crumple virus
- Begomovirus passifloracontorsionis, Passionfruit leaf distortion virus
- Begomovirus passiflorae, Passionfruit leaf curl virus
- Begomovirus passifloraseveri, Passionfruit severe leaf distortion virus
- Begomovirus pavoniae, Pavonia mosaic virus
- Begomovirus pavoniaflavi, Pavonia yellow mosaic virus
- Begomovirus pedilanthi, Pedilenthus leaf curl virus
- Begomovirus phaseoli, Bean leaf crumple virus
- Begomovirus phaseolialbi, Bean white chlorosis mosaic virus
- Begomovirus phaseolicaliconis, Bean calico mosaic virus
- Begomovirus phaseolichlorosis, Bean chlorosis virus
- Begomovirus phaseoligallici, French bean leaf curl virus
- Begomovirus phaseolilatens, Bean latent virus
- Begomovirus phaseolimexicoense, Bean yellow mosaic Mexico virus
- Begomovirus phaseoliretorridi, Bean bushy stunt virus
- Begomovirus phaseovulgaris, Common bean mottle virus
- Begomovirus pisi, Pea leaf distortion virus
- Begomovirus polygalae, Polygala garcinii virus
- Begomovirus pouzolziae, Pouzolzia golden mosaic virus
- Begomovirus pouzolziaflavi, Pouzolzia yellow mosaic virus
- Begomovirus pouzolziaguangdongense, Pouzolzia mosaic Guangdong virus
- Begomovirus premnae, Premna leaf curl virus
- Begomovirus puerariae, Kudzu mosaic virus
- Begomovirus puerense, Tobacco leaf curl Puer virus
- Begomovirus pyrenacanthae, Pyrenacantha yellow mosaic virus
- Begomovirus ramiis, Ramie mosaic Yunnan virus
- Begomovirus rhynchosiae, Rhynchosia mild mosaic virus
- Begomovirus rhynchosiaflavi, Rhynchosia yellow mosaic virus
- Begomovirus rhynchosiahavanaense, Rhynchosia golden mosaic Havana virus
- Begomovirus rhynchosiaindiaense, Rhynchosia yellow mosaic India virus
- Begomovirus rhynchosiarugosi, Rhynchosia rugose golden mosaic virus
- Begomovirus rhynchosiasinaloaense, Rhynchosia golden mosaic Sinaloa virus
- Begomovirus rhynchosiaurei, Rhynchosia golden mosaic virus
- Begomovirus rosae, Rose leaf curl virus
- Begomovirus sauropi, Sauropus leaf curl virus
- Begomovirus senecionis, Senecio yellow mosaic virus
- Begomovirus sennae, Senna leaf curl virus
- Begomovirus sidaalagoasense, Sida mosaic Alagoas virus
- Begomovirus sidaboliviaensecundi, Sida mosaic Bolivia virus 2
- Begomovirus sidaboliviaenseprimi, Sida mosaic Bolivia virus 1
- Begomovirus sidaciliaris, Sida ciliaris golden mosaic virus
- Begomovirus sidacontorsionis, Sida leaf curl virus
- Begomovirus sidaflavachinaense, Sida yellow mosaic China virus
- Begomovirus sidaflavacontorsionis, Sida yellow leaf curl virus
- Begomovirus sidaflavalagoense, Sida yellow mosaic Alagoas virus
- Begomovirus sidaflavamaculae, Sida yellow blotch virus
- Begomovirus sidaflavamusivi, Sida yellow mosaic virus
- Begomovirus sidaflavaneti, Sida yellow net virus
- Begomovirus sidaflavaureimusivi, Sida yellow golden mosaic virus
- Begomovirus sidaflavavariati, Sida yellow mottle virus
- Begomovirus sidaflavavenae, Sida yellow vein virus
- Begomovirus sidaflavavietnamense, Sida yellow vein Vietnam virus
- Begomovirus sidaflavayucatanense, Sida yellow mosaic Yucatan virus
- Begomovirus sidaflavi, Sida bright yellow mosaic virus
- Begomovirus sidaflavitessellati, Sida yellow mosaic Gujarat virus
- Begomovirus sidaintervenae, Sida interveinal bright yellow virus
- Begomovirus sidamicranthae, Sida micrantha mosaic virus
- Begomovirus sidamusivi, Sida angular mosaic virus
- Begomovirus sidapallidi, Sida chlorotic leaf virus
- Begomovirus sidapallivariati, Sida chlorotic mottle virus
- Begomovirus sidasinaloaense, Sida mosaic Sinaloa virus
- Begomovirus sidastri, Sidastrum golden leaf spot virus
- Begomovirus sidaureibracoense, Sida golden mosaic Braco virus
- Begomovirus sidaureibrazilense, Sida golden mosaic Brazil virus
- Begomovirus sidaureibuckupense, Sida golden mosaic Buckup virus
- Begomovirus sidaureicostaricaense, Sida golden mosaic Costa Rica virus
- Begomovirus sidaureidis, Sida golden mosaic virus
- Begomovirus sidaureifloridaense, Sida golden mosaic Florida virus
- Begomovirus sidaureilaraense, Sida golden mosaic Lara virus
- Begomovirus sidaureimaculae, Sida golden yellow spot virus
- Begomovirus sidaureivariati, Sida golden mottle virus
- Begomovirus sidaureivenae, Sida golden yellow vein virus
- Begomovirus sidavariati, Sida mottle virus
- Begomovirus sidavariatialagoense, Sida mottle Alagoas virus
- Begomovirus sidavenae, Sida chlorotic vein virus
- Begomovirus sidavulgaris, Sida common mosaic virus
- Begomovirus siegesbeckiae, Siegesbeckia yellow vein virus
- Begomovirus siegesbeckiaguangxiense, Siegesbeckia yellow vein Guangxi virus
- Begomovirus solanumamazonasense, Chino del tomate Amazonas virus
- Begomovirus solanumanjouanense, Tomato leaf curl Anjouan virus
- Begomovirus solanumaraguaense, Tomato mild yellow leaf curl Aragua virus
- Begomovirus solanumargentinaense, Tomato mottle wrinkle virus
- Begomovirus solanumarushaense, Tomato leaf curl Arusha virus
- Begomovirus solanumaureicontorsionis, Tomato golden leaf distortion virus
- Begomovirus solanumaureimaculae, Tomato golden leaf spot virus
- Begomovirus solanumaureimusivi, Tomato golden mosaic virus
- Begomovirus solanumaureivariati, Tomato golden mottle virus
- Begomovirus solanumaureivenae, Tomato golden vein virus
- Begomovirus solanumaureusreti, Tomato golden net virus
- Begomovirus solanumaustraliaense, Tomato leaf curl virus
- Begomovirus solanumbangalorense, Tomato leaf curl Bangalore virus
- Begomovirus solanumbangladeshense, Tomato leaf curl Bangladesh virus
- Begomovirus solanumboliviense, Solanum mosaic Bolivia virus
- Begomovirus solanumburkinafasoense, Tomato leaf curl Burkina Faso virus
- Begomovirus solanumcebuense, Tomato leaf curl Cebu virus
- Begomovirus solanumchinaense, Tomato leaf curl China virus
- Begomovirus solanumcomorosense, Tomato leaf curl Comoros virus
- Begomovirus solanumcontorsionis, Tomato leaf distortion virus
- Begomovirus solanumcrispi, Tomato wrinkled mosaic virus
- Begomovirus solanumdelhiense, Tomato leaf curl New Delhi virus
- Begomovirus solanumdelhiquarti, Tomato leaf curl New Delhi virus 4
- Begomovirus solanumdelhiquinti, Tomato leaf curl New Delhi virus 5
- Begomovirus solanumdelhisecundi, Tomato leaf curl New Delhi virus 2
- Begomovirus solanumdepravationis, Tomato leaf deformation virus
- Begomovirus solanumdianaense, Tomato leaf curl Diana virus
- Begomovirus solanumdistorsionis, Tomato mottle leaf distortion virus
- Begomovirus solanumflavariati, Tomato bright yellow mottle virus
- Begomovirus solanumflavi, Chino del tomate virus
- Begomovirus solanumflavusardiniaense, Tomato yellow leaf curl Sardinia virus
- Begomovirus solanumflavusaxarquiaense, Tomato yellow leaf curl Axarquia virus
- Begomovirus solanumflavuschinaense, Tomato yellow leaf curl China virus
- Begomovirus solanumflavuscontorsionis, Tomato yellow leaf distortion virus
- Begomovirus solanumflavusdepravationis, Tomato yellow leaf deformation dwarf virus
- Begomovirus solanumflavusguangdongense, Tomato yellow leaf curl Guangdong virus
- Begomovirus solanumflavushuangbaiense, Tomato yellow leaf curl Shuangbai virus
- Begomovirus solanumflavusindonesiaense, Tomato yellow leaf curl Indonesia virus
- Begomovirus solanumflavuskanchanaburiense, Tomato yellow leaf curl Kanchanaburi virus
- Begomovirus solanumflavusmaculae, Tomato yellow spot virus
- Begomovirus solanumflavusmalacitanum, Tomato yellow leaf curl Malaga virus
- Begomovirus solanumflavusmaliense, Tomato yellow leaf curl Mali virus
- Begomovirus solanumflavusmarginis, Tomato yellow margin leaf curl virus
- Begomovirus solanumflavusreti, Tomato yellow net viurs
- Begomovirus solanumflavusthailandense, Tomato yellow leaf curl Thailand virus
- Begomovirus solanumflavusvariati, Tomato yellow mottle virus
- Begomovirus solanumflavusvenae, Tomato yellow vein streak virus
- Begomovirus solanumflavusvietnamense, Tomato yellow leaf curl Vietnam virus
- Begomovirus solanumflavusyunnanense, Tomato yellow leaf curl Yunnan virus
- Begomovirus solanumghanaense, Tomato leaf curl Ghana virus
- Begomovirus solanumguangdongense, Tomato leaf curl Guangdong virus
- Begomovirus solanumguangxiense, Tomato leaf curl Guangxi virus
- Begomovirus solanumgujaratense, Tomato leaf curl Gujarat virus
- Begomovirus solanumhainanense, Tomato leaf curl Hainan virus
- Begomovirus solanumhanoiense, Tomato leaf curl Hanoi virus
- Begomovirus solanumhavanaense, Tomato mosaic Havana virus
- Begomovirus solanumhsinchuense, Tomato leaf curl Hsinchu virus
- Begomovirus solanumintervenae, Tomato interveinal chlorosis virus
- Begomovirus solanumiranense, Tomato leaf curl Iran virus
- Begomovirus solanumjapanense, Tomato leaf curl Japan virus
- Begomovirus solanumjavaense, Tomato leaf curl Java virus
- Begomovirus solanumjoydebpurense, Tomato leaf curl Joydebpur virus
- Begomovirus solanumkalakadaense, Tomato severe leaf curl Kalakada virus
- Begomovirus solanumkarnatakaense, Tomato leaf curl Karnataka virus
- Begomovirus solanumkarnatakasecundi, Tomato leaf curl Karnataka virus 2
- Begomovirus solanumkarnatakatertii, Tomato leaf curl Karnataka virus 3
- Begomovirus solanumkeralaense, Tomato leaf curl Kerala virus
- Begomovirus solanumkunenense, Tomato leaf curl Kunene virus
- Begomovirus solanumlaosense, Tomato leaf curl Laos virus
- Begomovirus solanumlapazense, Tomato chino La Paz virus
- Begomovirus solanumlatentis, Tomato latent virus
- Begomovirus solanumliwaense, Tomato leaf curl Liwa virus
- Begomovirus solanummadagascarense, Tomato leaf curl Madagascar virus
- Begomovirus solanummahense, Tomato leaf curl Mahé virus
- Begomovirus solanummalaysiaense, Tomato leaf curl Malaysia virus
- Begomovirus solanummaliense, Tomato leaf curl Mali virus
- Begomovirus solanummindanaoense, Tomato leaf curl Mindanao virus
- Begomovirus solanummoheliense, Tomato leaf curl Moheli virus
- Begomovirus solanummusivi, Tomato bright yellow mosaic virus
- Begomovirus solanumnamakelyense, Tomato leaf curl Namakely virus
- Begomovirus solanumnigeriaense, Tomato leaf curl Nigeria virus
- Begomovirus solanumpalampurense, Tomato leaf curl Palampur virus
- Begomovirus solanumpallidi, Tomato chlorotic leaf curl virus
- Begomovirus solanumpallidicontorsionis, Tomato chlorotic leaf distortion virus
- Begomovirus solanumpallidiguyanense, Tomato chlorotic mottle Guyane virus
- Begomovirus solanumpallidivariati, Tomato chlorotic mottle virus
- Begomovirus solanumparvi, Tomato dwarf leaf virus
- Begomovirus solanumpatnaense, Tomato leaf curl Patna virus
- Begomovirus solanumphilippinense, Tomato leaf curl Philippines virus
- Begomovirus solanumpunense, Tomato leaf curl Pune virus
- Begomovirus solanumrajasthanense, Tomato leaf curl Rajasthan virus
- Begomovirus solanumretorridi, Tomato curly stunt virus
- Begomovirus solanumrugosi, Tomato rugose mosaic virus
- Begomovirus solanumrugosiflavi, Tomato rugose yellow leaf curl virus
- Begomovirus solanumseveri, Tomato severe leaf curl virus
- Begomovirus solanumseverparvi, Tomato mosaic severe dwarf virus
- Begomovirus solanumseverugosi, Tomato severe rugose virus
- Begomovirus solanumseychellesense, Tomato leaf curl Seychelles virus
- Begomovirus solanumsinaloaense, Tomato leaf curl Sinaloa virus
- Begomovirus solanumsrilankaense, Tomato leaf curl Sri Lanka virus
- Begomovirus solanumsudanense, Tomato leaf curl Sudan virus
- Begomovirus solanumsulawesiense, Tomato leaf curl Sulawesi virus
- Begomovirus solanumtainoense, Tomato mottle Taino virus
- Begomovirus solanumtaiwanense, Tomato leaf curl Taiwan virus
- Begomovirus solanumtanzaniaense, Tomato leaf curl Tanzania virus
- Begomovirus solanumtenuimusivi, Tomato mild mosaic virus
- Begomovirus solanumtoliaraense, Tomato leaf curl Toliara virus
- Begomovirus solanumtortilis, Tomato twisted leaf virus
- Begomovirus solanumtumoris, Tomato enation leaf curl virus
- Begomovirus solanumugandaense, Tomato leaf curl Uganda virus
- Begomovirus solanumvariati, Tomato mottle virus
- Begomovirus solanumvariatuminvolutionis, Tomato mottle leaf curl virus
- Begomovirus solanumvenadepravationis, Tomato vein clearing leaf deformation virus
- Begomovirus solanumvietnamense, Tomato leaf curl Vietnam virus
- Begomovirus solanumviolavenae, Tomato leaf curl purple vein virus
- Begomovirus solanumvulgarismusivi, Tomato common mosaic virus
- Begomovirus spilanthis, Spilanthes yellow vein virus
- Begomovirus spinaciae, Spinach yellow vein virus
- Begomovirus stachytarphetae, Stachytarpheta leaf curl virus
- Begomovirus stanleyi, Sri Lankan cassava mosaic virus
- Begomovirus synedrellae, Synedrella yellow vein clearing virus
- Begomovirus telfairiae, Telfairia golden mosaic virus
- Begomovirus triumfettae, Triumfetta yellow mosaic virus
- Begomovirus tuberosi, Potato yellow mosaic virus
- Begomovirus tuberosumpanamaense, Potato yellow mosaic Panama virus
- Begomovirus verbenae, Verbena mottle virus
- Begomovirus vernoniae, Vernonia crinkle virus
- Begomovirus vernoniafujianense, Vernonia yellow vein Fujian virus
- Begomovirus vernoniavenae, Vernonia yellow vein virus
- Begomovirus vignae, Vigna yellow mosaic virus
- Begomovirus vignaflavi, Cowpea bright yellow mosaic virus
- Begomovirus vignamusivi, Cowpea golden mosaic virus
- Begomovirus vignaradiatae, Mungbean yellow mosaic virus
- Begomovirus vignaradiataindiaense, Mungbean yellow mosaic India virus
- Begomovirus vincae, Vinca leaf curl virus
- Begomovirus vulgaris, Common bean severe mosaic virus
- Begomovirus warburgi, South African cassava mosaic virus
- Begomovirus whitaniae, Withania leaf curl virus
- Begomovirus wissadulae, Wissadula golden mosaic virus
- Begomovirus wissadulaflavi, Wissadula yellow mosaic virus
