= Pepper huasteco yellow vein virus =

Virus classification
- (unranked): Virus
- Realm: Monodnaviria
- Kingdom: Shotokuvirae
- Phylum: Cressdnaviricota
- Class: Repensiviricetes
- Order: Geplafuvirales
- Family: Geminiviridae
- Genus: Begomovirus
- Species: Begomovirus capsicumhuastecoense

Synonyms
- Pepper huasteco virus

Species of virus

Pepper huasteco yellow vein virus (PHV) is a plant pathogenic virus of the family Geminiviridae.
