= Pepper golden mosaic virus =

Virus classification
- (unranked): Virus
- Realm: Monodnaviria
- Kingdom: Shotokuvirae
- Phylum: Cressdnaviricota
- Class: Repensiviricetes
- Order: Geplafuvirales
- Family: Geminiviridae
- Genus: Begomovirus
- Species: Begomovirus capsicummusivi

Synonyms
- Serrano golden mosaic virus; Texas pepper virus

Species of plant pathogenic virus of the family Geminiviridae

Pepper golden mosaic virus is a plant pathogenic virus of the family Geminiviridae. It affects Capsicum annuum and all tomatoes. It was first discovered in Texas in 1987, and was called Texas Pepper Virus, and a two years later in Mexico after it destroyed up to 100% of plants in afflicted fields in the autumn of 1989, mainly in north-west Mexico.
