= PHV =

PHV may refer to:

- Patrick Henry Village, a United States Army installation at Heidelberg, Germany, 1947–2013
- Pepper Huasteco virus
- Pharmacovigilance
- Plug-in hybrid vehicle
- Private hire vehicle
- Pro hac vice, a legal term
