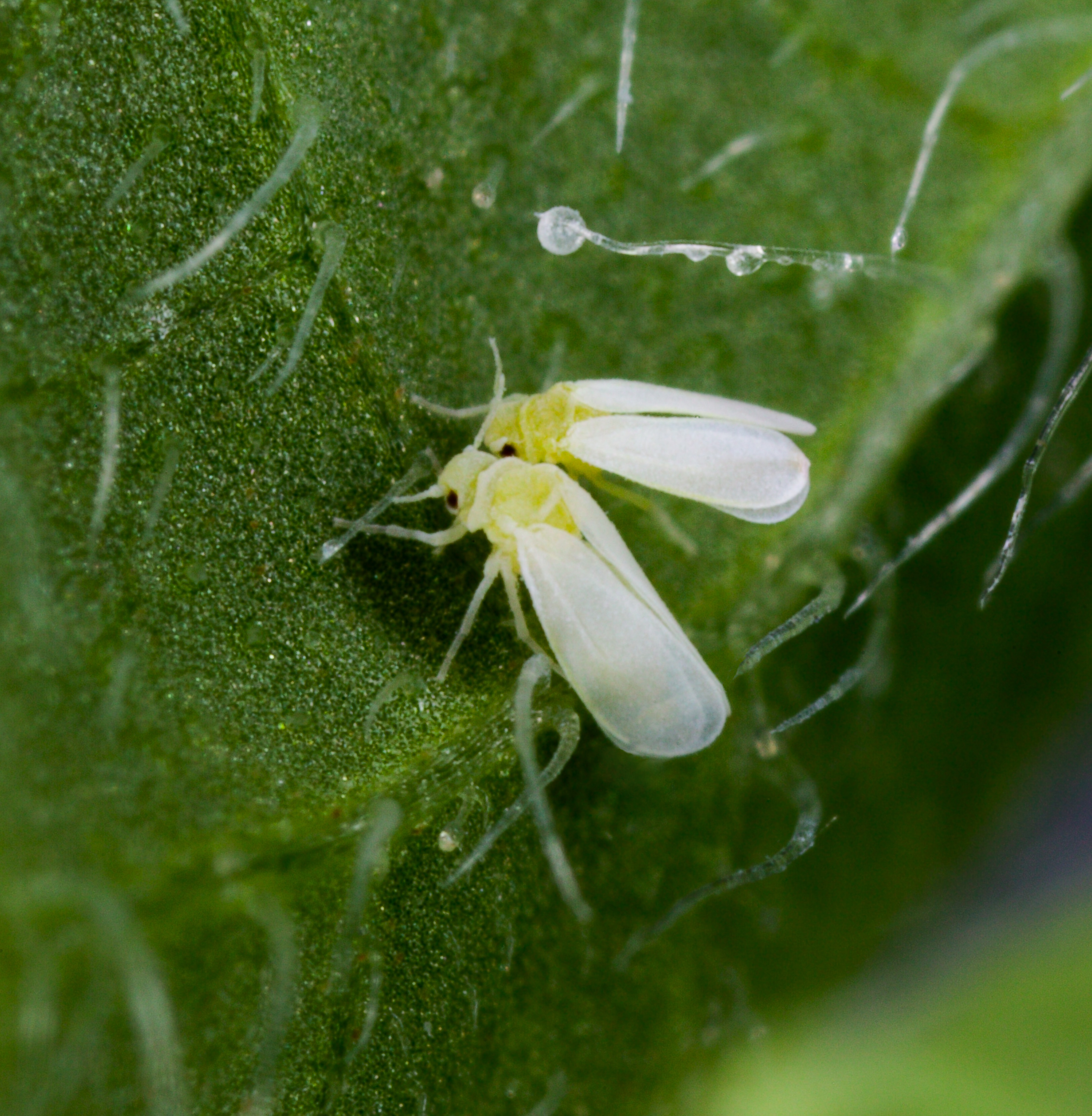
- Bemisia tabaci

Scientific classification
- Domain: Eukaryota
- Kingdom: Animalia
- Phylum: Arthropoda
- Class: Insecta
- Order: Hemiptera
- Suborder: Sternorrhyncha
- Family: Aleyrodidae
- Genus: Bemisia; Quaintance & Baker, 1914

= Bemisia =

Genus of true bugs

Bemisia is a genus of whitefly in the family Aleyrodidae.

== Species ==
- Bemisia afer Priesner & Hosny, 1934
- Bemisia alni Takahashi, 1957
- Bemisia antennata Gameel, 1968
- Bemisia bambusae Takahashi, 1942
- Bemisia berbericola (Cockerell, 1896)
- Bemisia capitata Regu & David, 1991
- Bemisia caudasculptura Quaintance & Baker, 1937
- Bemisia centroamericana Martin, 2005
- Bemisia combreticula Bink-Moenen, 1983
- Bemisia confusa Danzig, 1964
- Bemisia cordylinidis Dumbleton, 1961
- Bemisia decipiens (Maskell, 1896)
- Bemisia elliptica Takahashi, 1960
- Bemisia flocculosa Gill & Holder, 2011
- Bemisia formosana Takahashi, 1933
- Bemisia giffardi (Kotinsky, 1907)
- Bemisia gigantea Martin, 1999
- Bemisia grossa Singh, 1931
- Bemisia guierae Bink-Moenen, 1983
- Bemisia hirta Bink-Moenen, 1983
- Bemisia lampangensis Takahashi, 1942
- Bemisia lauracea Martin, Aguiar & Pita, 1996
- Bemisia leakii (Peal, 1903)
- Bemisia medinae Gomez-Menor, 1954
- Bemisia mesasiatica Danzig, 1969
- Bemisia moringae David & Subramaniam, 1976
- Bemisia multituberculata Sundararaj & David, 1990
- Bemisia ovata Goux, 1940
- Bemisia poinsettiae Hempel, 1922
- Bemisia pongamiae Takahashi, 1931
- Bemisia porteri Corbett, 1935
- Bemisia psiadiae Takahashi, 1955
- Bemisia puerariae Takahashi, 1955
- Bemisia religiosa (Peal, 1903)
- Bemisia shinanoensis Kuwana, 1922
- Bemisia spiraeae Young, 1944
- Bemisia spiraeoides Mound & Halsey, 1978
- Bemisia subdecipiens Martin, 1999
- Bemisia sugonjaevi Danzig, 1969
- Bemisia tabaci (Gennadius, 1889)(formerly known as Bemisia argentifolii) (silverleaf whitefly)
- Bemisia tuberculata Bondar, 1923
