= Tomato yellow leaf curl virus =

Virus classification
- (unranked): Virus
- Realm: Floreoviria
- Kingdom: Shotokuvirae
- Phylum: Cressdnaviricota
- Class: Repensiviricetes
- Order: Geplafuvirales
- Family: Geminiviridae
- Genus: Begomovirus
- Species: Begomovirus coheni

Species of virus

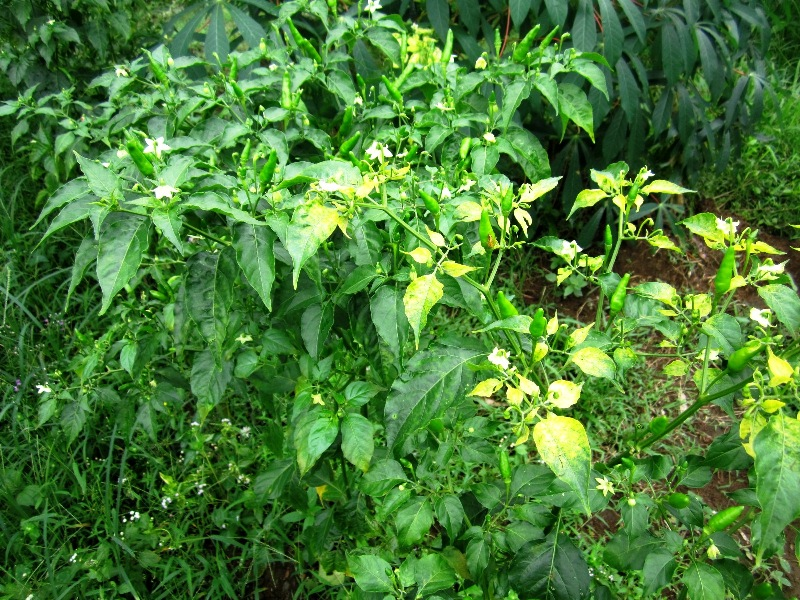
Symptom of yellow curl leaf disease in chilli pepper leaves

Tomato yellow leaf curl virus (TYLCV) is a DNA virus from the genus Begomovirus and the family Geminiviridae. TYLCV is one of the most serious diseases affecting tomato plants, especially in tropical and subtropical areas, where it often causes major crop losses. This virus is transmitted by an insect vector from the family Aleyrodidae and order Hemiptera, the whitefly Bemisia tabaci, commonly known as the silverleaf whitefly or the sweet potato whitefly. The primary host for TYLCV is the tomato plant, and other plant hosts where TYLCV infection has been found include eggplants, potatoes, tobacco, beans, and peppers. Due to the rapid spread of TYLCV in the last few decades, there is an increased focus in research trying to understand and control this damaging pathogen. Some interesting findings include the virus being sexually transmitted from infected males to non-infected females (and vice versa), and an evidence that TYLCV is transovarially transmitted to offspring for two generations.

== Genome ==
This virus consists of a single circular single-stranded (ss) DNA molecule (2787 nt in size) which is a common distinction among viruses in the family Geminiviridae. The coat protein is an essential component for successful insect transmission of this virus. The ssDNA genome encodes for six open reading frames (ORF): two in the virion sense orientation, V1 and V2, and four in the complementary orientation, C1, C2, C3, and C4. The V1 and V2 protein encoded by the v1 and v2 gene are the coat protein and pre-coat protein, respectively. The function of the V1 protein, identified as the coat protein, is to encapsulate the ssDNA and form the virus particle to protect the viral DNA, while the pre-coat protein is believed to be involved in movement of the virus.

The six open reading frames encoded by the TYLCV genome are V1, V2, C1, C2, C3, and C4. V1 protein is the coat protein and its function is to protect the viral DNA by encapsulating it. V2 protein is the pre-coat protein, which function is still not clear, but it might be associated with viral movement. C1 protein is also known as the viral replication protein, which makes it essential for virus replication. C2, C3, and C4 proteins have been associated to function as a post-transcriptional gene silencing suppressor, a virus accumulation enhancer, and a symptom induction determinant, respectively. In the insect vector, a study found that TYLCV had a high binding affinity to a GroEL homolog, a molecular chaperon essential for protein folding. Therefore, after feeding B. tabaci with a diet containing antiserum against GroEL, they found TYLCV transmission to be reduced. This study demonstrated that the GroEL homolog is involved in the virus transmission.

== Transmission ==
TYLCV is transmitted by the insect vector Bemisia tabaci in a persistent-circulative nonpropagative manner. The virus can be efficiently transmitted during the adult stages. This virus transmission has a short acquisition access period of 15–20 minutes, and latent period of 8–24 hours. In this plant-virus and vector system, females are more effective than males transmitting the virus. A study demonstrated that TYLCV is transmitted to offspring for at least two generations. Also, it has been demonstrated that a TYLCV isolate from Israel is sexually transmitted from one insect to another. In this study, they found that the virus was transmitted to males from virus-infected females and to females from virus-infected males.

== Agricultural importance ==
Symptoms of TYLCV infection include severe stunting, reduction of leaf size, upward cupping/curling of leaves, chlorosis on leaves and flowers, and reduction of fruit production. This virus can cause significant yield losses from 90–100%, and it is estimated that about 7 million hectares can experience TYLCV infection or mixed virus infections annually. Treatments that are commonly used for this disease include insecticides, hybrid seeds, and growing tomatoes under greenhouse conditions. Developing countries are most affected by this crop disease due to both the climate and the high costs of treatments used in order to control it. The primary plant host impacted by TYLCV infection are tomato plants, but other plant hosts used for food such as peppers (Capsicum annuum) and beans (Phaseolus vulgaris), as well as weeds/flowers (Datura stramonium and Malva parviflora) can be affected by TYLCV.

== Epidemiology ==
TYLCV is found in tropical and subtropical regions, and it is one of the most important pathogens against tomato crops around the world. This virus was first detected in Israel around 1930, and now it affects more than 30 countries around the world that grow tomatoes. TYLCV has been found in different countries from Africa, Asia, Australia, and Central and North America. The two isolates of TYLCV that are most commonly found in affected countries are Tomato yellow leaf curl Sardinia virus (TYLCSV) and Tomato yellow leaf curl virus-Israel (TYLCV-Isr). The first detection of TYLCV was confirmed through blot hybridization, PCR, and genome sequencing in the Dominican Republic in 1994. From here, it was then found in Jamaica and Cuba. One of the most effective techniques to detect geminiviruses in tomato is the visualization of inclusion bodies using a light microscope, as well as the immunological detection with antibodies. Not only has the virus spread over the last few decades, but its insect vector has a wide distribution range as well. Bemisia tabaci has a wide geographical distribution, and it can be found in Asia, Africa, North, Central, and South America, and Australia. Since the insect vector has a wide distribution range, the virus can be spread to new areas where it has not been found but the insect is present.

== Management ==
Currently, the most effective treatments used to control the spread of TYLCV are insecticides and resistant crop varieties. The effectiveness of insecticides is not optimal in tropical areas due to whitefly resistance against the insecticides; therefore, insecticides should be alternated or mixed to provide the most effective treatment against virus transmission. Developing countries experience the most significant losses due to TYLCV infections due to the warm climate as well as the expensive costs of insecticides used as the control strategy. Other methods to control the spread of TYLCV include planting resistant/tolerant lines, crop rotation, and breeding for resistance of TYLCV. As with many other plant viruses, one of the most promising methods to control TYLCV is the production of transgenic tomato plants resistant to TYLCV.

== Resources ==
- Description of Family Groups: http://www.virology.net/Big_Virology/BVFamilyGroup.html
- Tomato Leaves Rolling?: http://www.clemson.edu/extension/hgic/hot_topics/2008/05tomato_leaf_roll.html
- Bemisia tabaci distribution: http://www.cabi.org/isc/datasheet/8927
