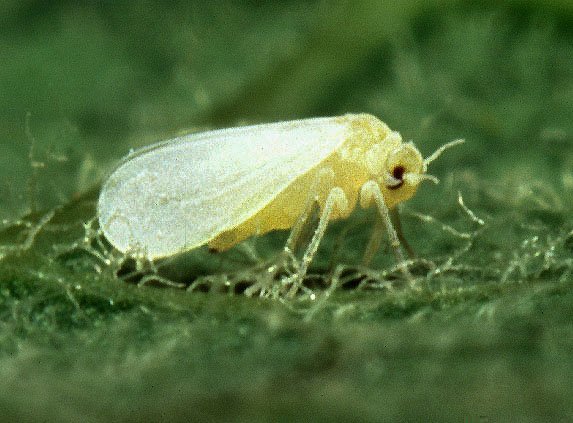

Scientific classification
- Kingdom: Animalia
- Phylum: Arthropoda
- Class: Insecta
- Order: Hemiptera
- Suborder: Sternorrhyncha
- Family: Aleyrodidae
- Genus: Bemisia
- Species: B. tabaci

Binomial name
- Bemisia tabaci (Gennadius, 1889)

Synonyms
- Bemisia argentifolii Bellows & Perring

= Silverleaf whitefly =

Species of true bug

The silverleaf whitefly (Bemisia tabaci, also informally referred to as the sweet potato whitefly and cotton whitefly) is one of several species of whitefly that are currently important agricultural pests. A review in 2011 concluded that the silverleaf whitefly is actually a species complex containing at least 40 morphologically indistinguishable species.

The silverleaf whitefly thrives worldwide in tropical, subtropical, and less predominately in temperate habitats. Cold temperatures kill both the adults and the nymphs of the species. The silverleaf whitefly can be confused with other insects such as the common fruitfly, but with close inspection, the whitefly is slightly smaller and has a distinct wing color that helps to differentiate it from other insects.

While the silverleaf whitefly had been known in the United States since 1896, in the mid-1980s an aggressive strain appeared in poinsettia crops in Florida. For convenience that strain was referred to as strain B (biotype B), to distinguish it from the milder infestation of the earlier known strain A. Less than a year after its identification, strain B was found to have moved to tomatoes, and other fruit and vegetable crops. Within five years, the silverleaf whitefly had caused over $100 million in damage to agriculture in Texas and in California.

== Anatomy and life cycle ==
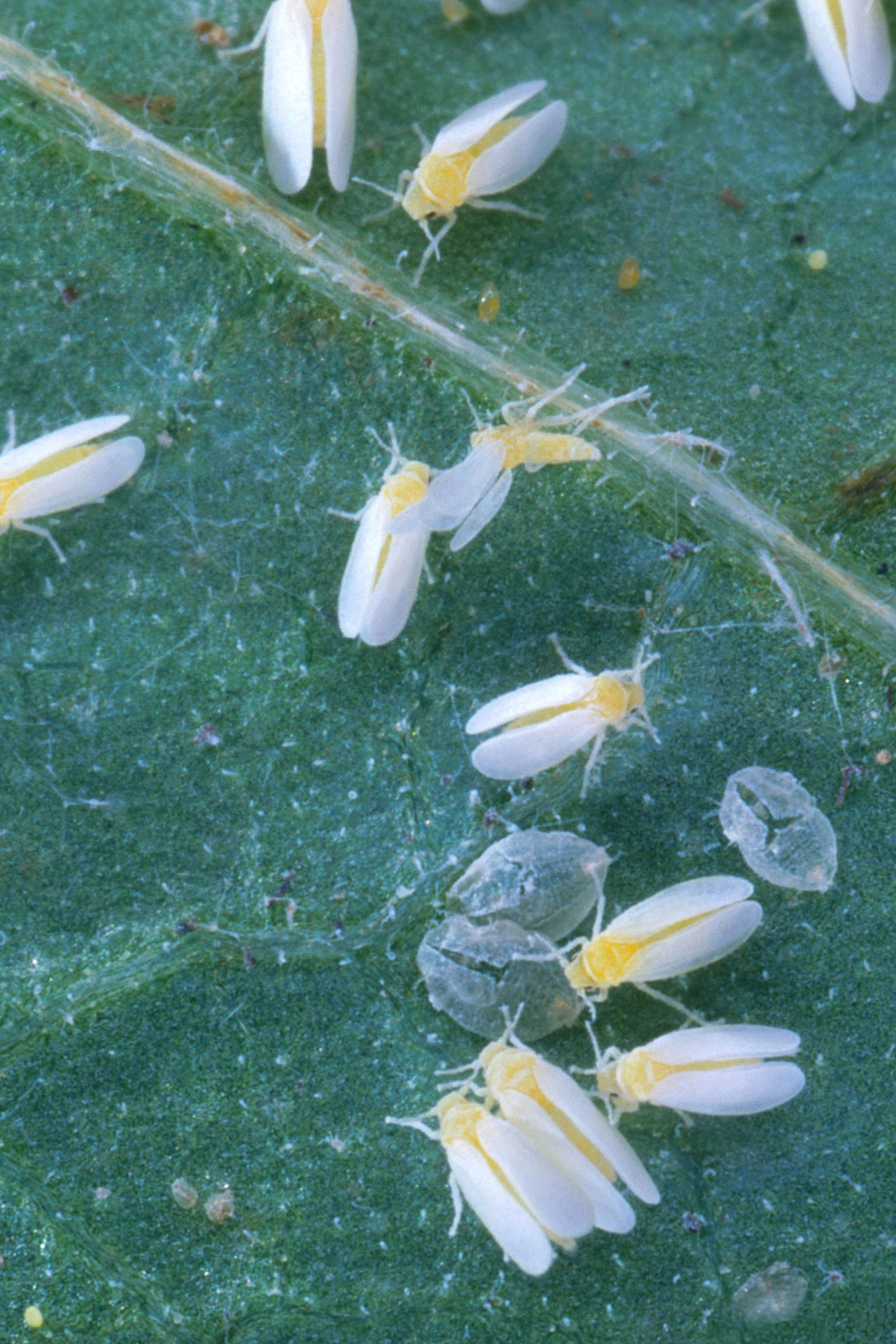
Bemisia tabaci molting on leaves. The silver empty structures on the leaves are cast-off skins.

Female B. tabaci will lay 50 to 400 eggs ranging from 0.10 to 0.25 millimetres (1/128 to 1/128 in) on the under part of leaves. Female whiteflies are diploid and emerge from fertilized eggs whereas male whiteflies are haploid and emerge from unfertilized eggs. Eggs are laid in groups, being small in size with dimensions of 0.2 millimetres (1/128 in) wide and 0.1 millimetres (1/128 in) in height. Eggs are initially whitish in color and change to a brown color near hatching, within 5 to 7 days. After hatching, the whitefly nymph develops through four instar stages.

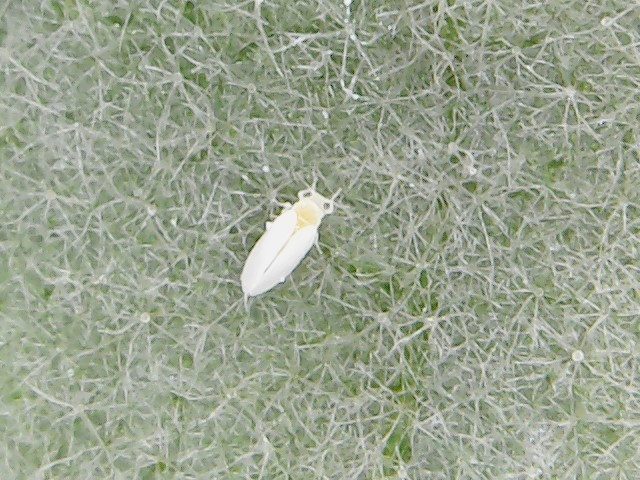
An adult Silverleaf Whitefly (Bemisia tabaci) on surface of Cotton leaf

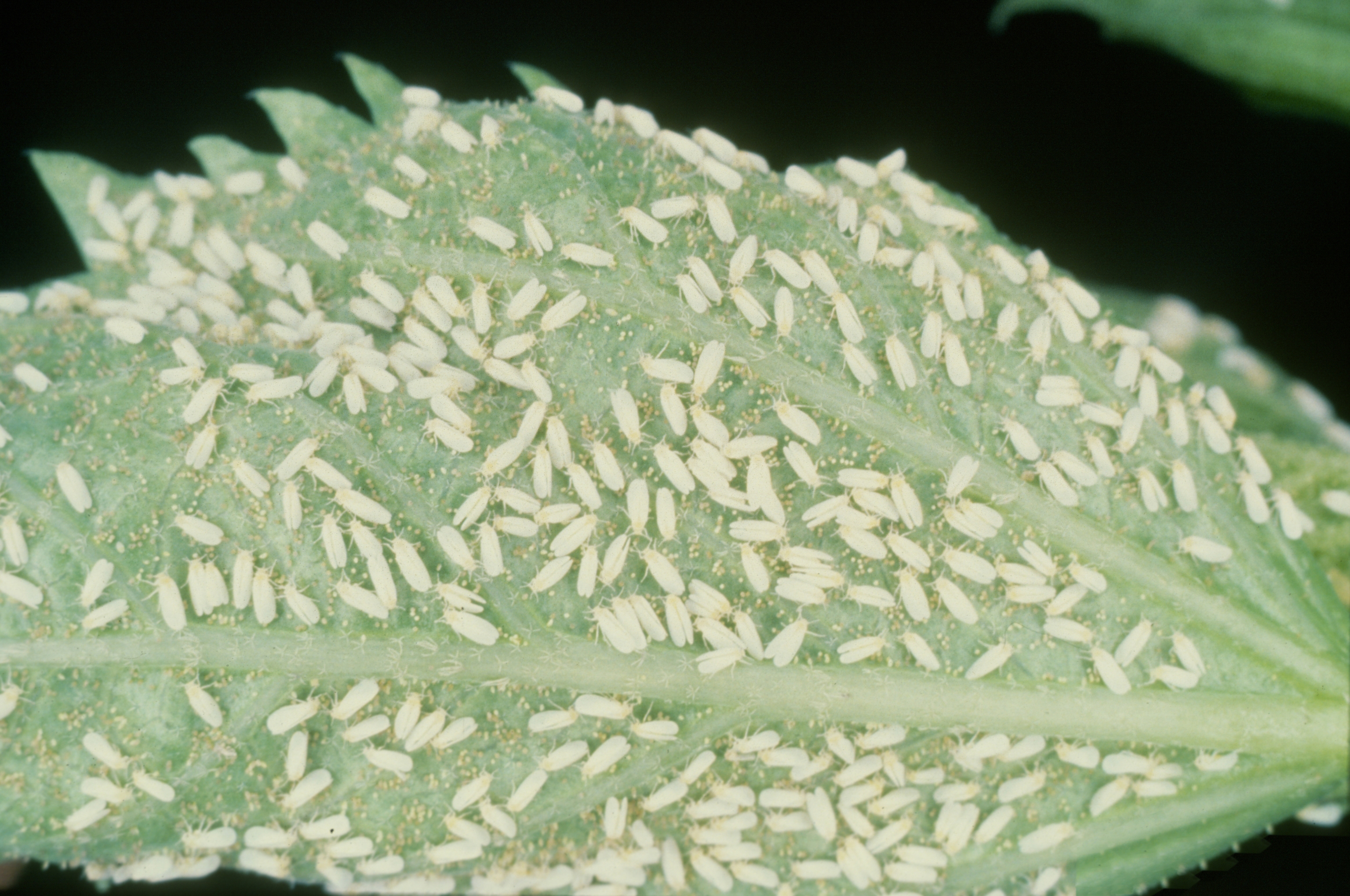
Bemisia tabaci adult whiteflies on green leaf

The first instar, commonly called a crawler, is the only mobile nymphal stage. The first instar nymph can grow to about 0.3 millimetres (1/64 in) and is greenish in color and flat in body structure. The mobile nymph walks to find a suitable area on the leaf with adequate nutrients and molts into an immobile stage. The next three instars remain in place for 40–50 days, until molting into an adult. Silver exuvia, or shed skins are left on the leaves. The immobile instars appear opaquely white. Nymphs feed by stabbing into the plant with their mouth-parts and sucking up plant juices. After the fourth instar, the nymph transforms into a pupal stage where the eyes become a deep red color, the body color becomes yellow, and the body structure thickens. This is not a true pupal stage, as is found in the Holometabola, but is similar in function. Adult whiteflies are approximately four times the size of the egg, with light yellow bodies and white wings, which is attributed by the secretion of wax across its wings and body. Adult silverleaf whiteflies can reach up to 0.9 millimetres (5/128 in) in length. While feeding or resting the whitefly adult folds its wings tent-like over its body.

== Distribution ==
=== Native/original community ===
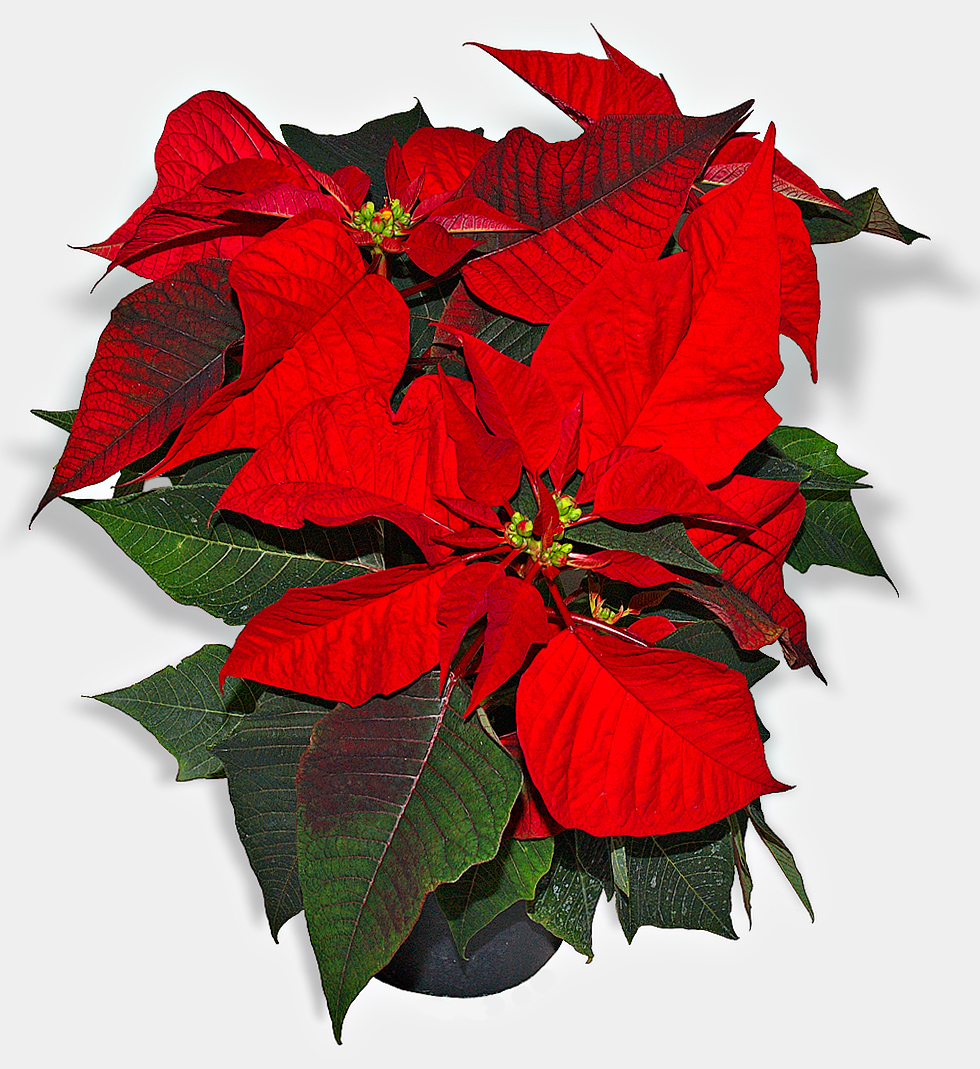
Poinsettia is one of the silverleaf whitefly's preferred hosts.

Research indicates that the silverleaf whitefly likely came from India. Since the whitefly is predominately associated with areas exhibiting tropical/subtropical climates, the focus shifts to how these insects attained access to crops in habitats with temperate climates. One hypothesis suggests that the transfer of decorative plants from tropical regions may have aided in the spread of the silverleaf whiteflies to temperate environments. The ability of the whitefly to adapt to various plants facilitates the spread of dangerous plant viruses, which these insects are notorious for transmitting. Plants which are affected by the whitefly include: tomatoes, squash, poinsettia, cucumber, eggplants, okra, beans, and cotton. Other common plant damages of whitefly include: removing plant sap, breakdown of the leaves of the plant, and leaf shedding.

=== Introduced range ===
The silverleaf whitefly is an invasive agricultural pest in many locations around the world, including in Florida and in California.

== Commercial impact ==
The silverleaf whitefly is considered an invasive species in the United States as well as Australia, Africa, and several European countries. It was classified as an agricultural pest in Greece around 1889 and had a significant impact on tobacco crops there. The first silverleaf whitefly was found in the United States in 1897 on a crop of sweet potatoes.

This tiny insect causes damage to plants through feeding and transmitting plant diseases. The silverleaf whitefly feeds on its host plants by piercing the phloem or lower leaf surfaces with its mouth and removing nutrients. Affected areas of the plant may develop chlorotic spots, whither, or drop leaves. Whiteflies also produce a sticky substance called honeydew, which is left behind on the host. Honeydew can induce the growth of sooty molds, which can then reduce the plants ability to absorb light. This results in slower growth, lower yield, and poor quality plants. It also requires that crops be thoroughly washed after harvesting, which raises processing costs for the grower.

The silverleaf whitefly is also a notorious vector for plant disease. It has transmitted gemniviruses including lettuce infectious yellows virus, tomato yellow leaf curl virus, and African cassava mosaic virus for years and over many continents and is now a vector for cassava brown streak virus disease.

Bemisia tabaci became a serious issue in crops across the southwestern United States and Mexico in the 1980s. Scientists speculate that this pest was introduced via infested ornamental plants brought into the United States at this time. Florida's poinsettia greenhouses were crippled by the pest beginning in 1986, and by 1991, the infestation had spread through Georgia, Louisiana, Texas, New Mexico, and Arizona to plague growers in California. California produces approximately 90% of the United States’ winter vegetable crop, and has incurred an estimated $500 million in crop damage due to silverleaf whitefly populations. Across the agricultural industry, this pest is thought to cost the state $774 million in private sector plant sales, 12,540 jobs, and $112.5 million in personal income. On a national scale, the United States has suffered crop and ornamental plant damages in excess of $1 billion.

This species of whitefly is a particularly devastating pest because it feeds on over 500 plant species. Common hosts are agricultural crops including tomatoes, squash, broccoli, cauliflower, cabbage, melons, cotton, carrots, sweet potato, cucumber, and pumpkin, and ornamental plants such as poinsettia, crepe myrtle, garden roses, lantana, and lilies. It can cause specific damage to certain host plants, like "silverleaf" on squash, irregular ripening of tomatoes, whitestalk in broccoli and cauliflower, white stem in poinsettia, and light root in carrots.

== Nuclear receptors ==
B. tabaci like all arthropods has ecdysone receptors (EcRs) which may be useful for insecticide development. Carmichael et al., 2005 presents the X-ray crystal structure for the 1Z5X ligand-binding domain of the B. tabaci EcR.

== Integrated pest management ==
Multiple methods of control can be used to combat these prevalent agricultural pests. Some major control methods include, application of oils, use of natural enemies such as Aphelinidae parasitoids, employment of trap crops, release of insect growth regulators, and implementation of traps.

Most of these control tools have a minimal effect on plant and soil properties. Scientists are currently focusing on targeting the whitefly through mechanisms that do not cause pollution or contamination (i.e., mechanisms other than insecticides). It is important to be able to reduce the number of B. tabaci individuals that settle on plants to decrease plant damages such as those caused by viral transmissions. This can be accomplished by reducing settling, decreasing oviposition, and abating population development.

=== Biological controls ===
Classical biological control has been the best long-term, sustainable solution to controlling these exotic pests. However, success of this method can be unpredictable.

Entomologists with the U.S. Arid-Land Agricultural Research Center identified the most common causes of death of the whitefly as predation by other insects, parasitism, and weather induced dislodgement. They emphasize the importance of exploiting the use of natural predators and have identified predators by the use of enzyme-linked immune sorbent assay (ELISA). It was found that the use of the biological controls and insect growth regulators produces a higher predator-to-prey ratio. Insect growth regulators, such as buprofezin and pyriproxyfen, conserve natural predators compared to conventional insecticides, which can indiscriminately kill both predator and pest populations.

==== Natural enemies ====
Predators, parasitoids, and pathogens specific to whiteflies can keep populations under control.

Species in eight arthropod orders are known to be predators of B. tabaci. These include members of the families Phytoseiidae, Coccinellidae, Syrphidae, Anthocoridae, Nabidae, and Miridae, Chrysopidae and Coniopterygidae. There are currently four species of predators that are commercially available for control of B. tabaci: Delphastus pusillus, Macrolophus caliginosus, Chrysoperla carnea, and C. rufilabris. D. pusillus is a species of small, shiny, black beetle which sucks out the contents of the silverleaf whitefly by piercing its exoskeleton. Adult and larval stages of this beetle feed on all life stages of the pest. C. rufilabris is only able to feed on the immature stages or the larval stages of B. tabaci.

Another natural enemy of the whitefly are parasitoids, which kill their host once their development has been completed. Parasitoids in the families Platygasteridae, Aphelinidae, and Eulophidae are known to attack whiteflies. Establishment of several Old World species of Eretmocerus wasps has been attempted in the Western United States to control B. tabaci. However, differences in climate preference by these wasps reduced their effect. The best studied of these whitefly parasitoids are Encarsia formosa and Eretmocerus eremicus, both of which are commercially available. The Encarsia formosa "Beltsville Strain", however, has been unsuccessful in control B. tabaci biotype B in commercial greenhouses; it is only able to control the species in small experimental greenhouses. The species Encarsia formosa works much better at controlling the whitefly species Trialeurodes vaporariorum than it does B. tabaci. Eretmocerus sp. has been found more successful at B. tabaci than the E. formosa "Beltsville Strain". The wasps are faster at searching for patches of host nymphs are consistent at controlling the population. A variable release strategy of parasitoids has been found successfully able to control populations of B. tabaci. This was done by releasing six female parasitoids per week for the first half of the growing season, and only one female per week for the remaining of the season. This improved the effectiveness of the parasitoid wasps by ensuring they were continuously available to attack the pests, but in numbers that reflected the shrinking population of pests. If natural enemies are not able to control the pest population at low levels due to a significant increase in pest, an insecticide compatible with the biological control agent could be used to assist in reducing the pest population to low levels again.

Another natural mechanism of controlling the population of B. tabaci is the use of fungal pathogens. The most commonly known pathogens to the whitefly pest are Paecilomyces fumosoroseus, Aschersonia aleyrodis, Verticillium lecanii, and Beauveria bassiana. When spore solutions of V. lecanii are sprayed on eggs of B. tabaci approximately 89% to 90% of these eggs are killed. Some strains of whitefly have developed resistance to its fungal pathogens including V. lecanii.

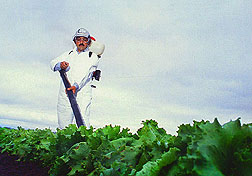
A technician is applying Beauveria bassiana, a fungus that is a natural enemy to silverleaf whiteflies to a plot of vegetables near Weslaco, Texas.

B. bassiana is only an effective biological control agent in conditions of low temperatures (maximum of 20 °C (68 °F)) and a humidity level greater than 96%. Not enough studies have been conducted to show the productiveness of fungal pathogen in the real world environment. Much of the success of this biological control on B. tabaci has been conducted in the laboratory. However, it can be concluded though that when the fungal pathogen is combined with an insecticide, the synergistic effect of the two will induce a higher mortality rate of the whitefly. P. fumosoroseus has a broad host range but can attack silverleaf whiteflies at a variety of life stages and these include eggs, nymphs, pupae, and adults stages. On the other hand, A. aleyrodis only infects and destroys nymphs and pupae.

=== Chemical controls ===
==== Natural oils ====
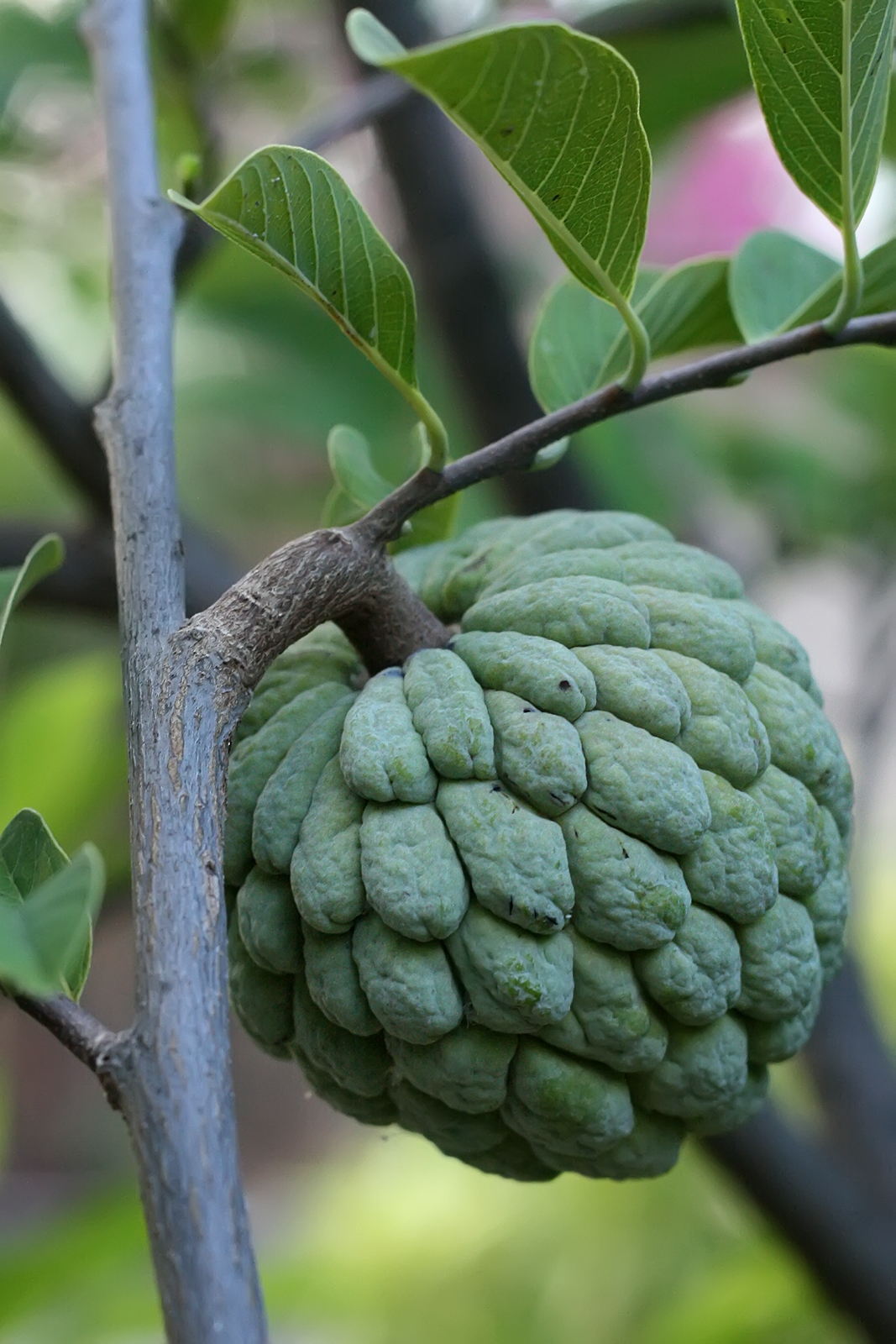
The sugar apple seed oil is an effective chemical control against the whitefly.

Natural oils are another important tool in the control of B. tabaci. Currently, the most effective oil in the market is the ultra-fine oil, which is a paraffinic oil product that reduces the settlement of the adult flies, decreases oviposition, and abates the transmission of the tomato yellow leaf curl virus. The effect of ultra-fine oil can be strengthened through the combination with oils such as limonene or citronellal. Olive oil is also highly effective in controlling the number of whiteflies. Other natural oils such as cottonseed, castor, peanut, soybean, and sunflower can be effective. Peanut oil was the most effective out of this group in reducing the population. All of these oils cause direct mortality to immature life stages of the silverleaf whitefly on contact and reduce settling and ovipositon by adults when sprayed on plant leaves. The oil extracted from the seeds of sugar apple has also been found effective against the whitefly. This oil causes the silverleaf whitefly nymph to shrink in size and therefore detach from the tomato plant, leading to starvation. Sugar apple seed oil is not phytotoxic to tomato plants of any concentrations and reduces the survival rate of the pest.

==== Insect growth regulators ====
Insecticides can be costly, and have an increasing risk of resistance by whiteflies. However, the insect growth regulator pyriproxyfen has been found successful in reducing whitefly populations on curbit plants including zucchini squash, cucumber, and pumpkin. This hormone is a juvenile hormone analogue, which affects hormonal balance and chitin in immature insects, and causes deformation and death during molting and pupation. This insect growth regulator does not kill adult whiteflies, and has low toxicity to mammals, fish, birds and bumblebees.

=== Mechanical controls ===
==== Man-made traps and covers ====
Traps offer a pesticide free method of control of B. tabaci. The Light-Emitting Diode Equipped CC trap (LED-CC) was developed by plant physiologist Chang-Chi Chu and Thomas Henneberry. Originally, the trap was used to monitor population of silverleaf whitefly populations, but as the trap was improved it was used in control programs to limit whitefly pest populations. The trap itself includes a green LED light that attracts and traps the whiteflies. The LED device works best at night, and is inexpensive and durable. In addition, the LED does not harm predators and parasitoids of the whitefly.

Another technique used to reduce virus damage include the use of floating row covers, which are covers used to keep plants from exposure from pests. Field studies conducted in Australia have shown that the use of floating row covers coupled with insect growth regulators increase the yield of harvested fruit and quality and reduce virus damage to cucurbits.

==== Trap crops ====
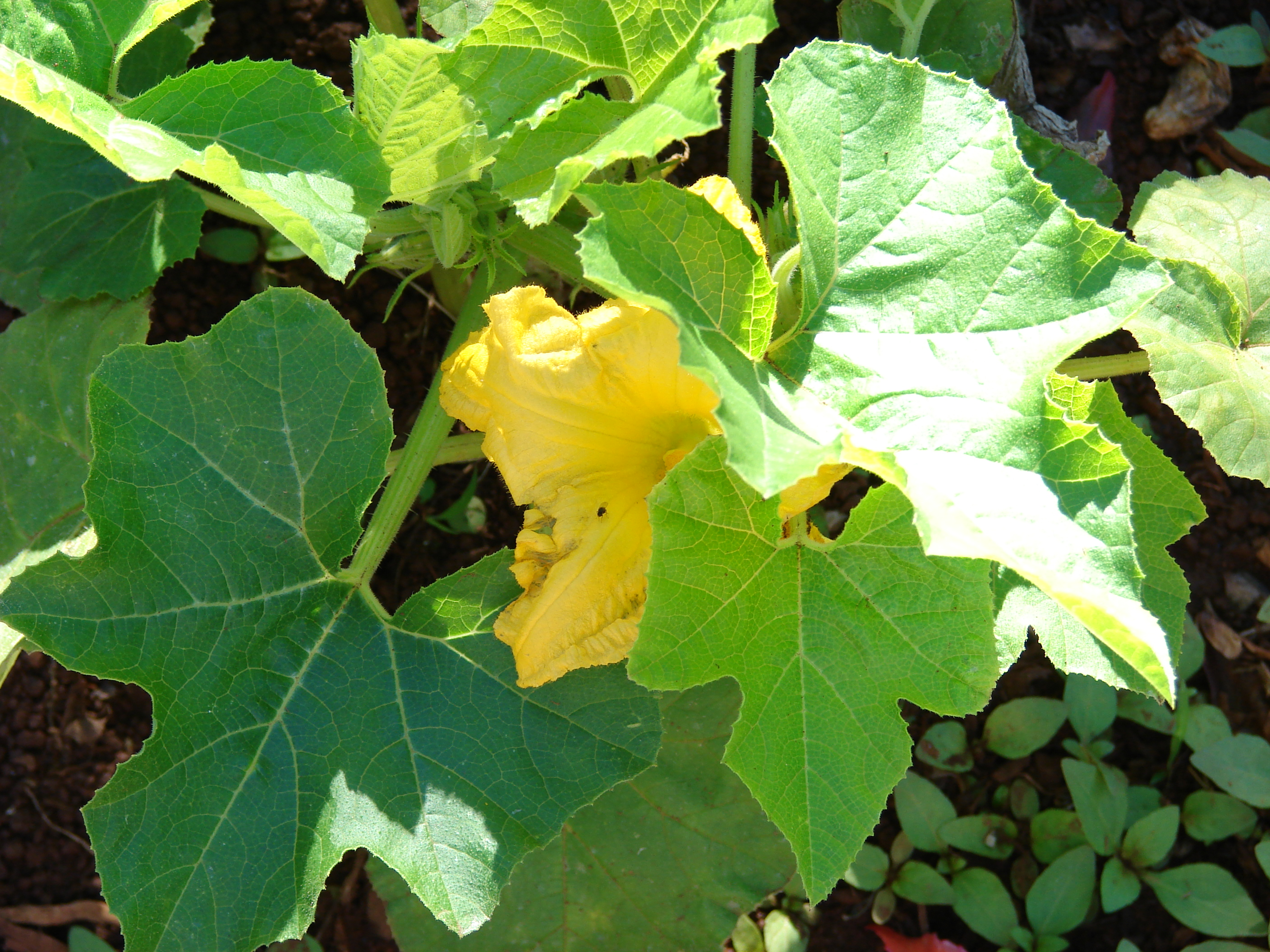
Squash crops are effectively used as trap crops for attracting silverleaf whitefly.

Another important control is the use of other crops as a source of trap crops. Squashes can act as trap crops for the silverleaf whitefly due to the flies’ attraction to these crops. Silverleaf whiteflies are actually more attracted to the squash crop than they are to the tomato plant. When squash serves as a trap crop, the tomato yellow curl leaf virus can be controlled and limited. Scientific experiments show in the fields that growing squash crops around the areas where tomato plants can be found is a useful manipulation in regulating the silverleaf whitefly population as well as the transmission of TYLCV. Other plants that can serve as trap crops include cantaloupe and cucumber.

=== Cultural controls ===
Through a cultural control method, different planting areas can limit the amount of B. tabaci infected plants. Planting different host crops away from each other will decrease the number of plants the flies will be able to infect. Thus, the best control is to maximize the distance and time interval between host crops. Good sanitation in winter and spring crops is also required for the maintenance and control of the fly population. Weeds and host crop residues must be removed immediately to avoid infestation. Silver/aluminum cover mulches can repel the adult silverleaf whitefly. Thus, when planting seeds, placing a reflective polyethylene mulch on planting beds will significantly reduce the rate of colonization.

Cultural controls are very important to crops such as vegetables and fruit. For example, in the family Cucurbitaceae, vegetables such as watermelon and squash contract squash vein yellowing virus (SqVYV) by the silverleaf whitefly. The SqVYV virus discovered by plant pathologist Benny Bruton and Shaker Kousik is essentially a crippling disease of the watermelon, which leads to the vine of the watermelon to collapse, causing the death of the watermelon before harvest. Kousik and pathologist Scott Adkins at ARS Subtropical Plant Pathology Research Unit worked together in screening the watermelon germplasm for resistance to SqVYV as to search for potential sources of resistance in wild-type watermelon. Kousik examined different combinations of insecticides and silver plastic mulch that could be used to reduce the whitefly populations.
