= Floreoviria =

Virus classification
- (unranked): Virus
- Realm: Floreoviria
- Kingdom: Shotokuvirae

Subtaxa
- See text

Synonyms
- Monodnaviria

Realm of viruses

Floreoviria is a realm of eukaryotic viruses that contains all viruses that encode a replication protein that has an N-terminal HUH superfamily endonuclease domain and a C-terminal superfamily 3 helicase domain, as well as all viruses descended from such viruses. Floreovirians typically have circular single-stranded DNA (ssDNA) genomes, but some have linear ssDNA genomes or circular double-stranded DNA (dsDNA) genomes. The prototypical members of the realm are commonly called CRESS-DNA viruses, which stands for circular, Rep-encoding ssDNA viruses. The replication (Rep) protein is involved in initiating replication of viruses in Floreoviria.

Along with the shared replication protein, most floreovirians encode a major capsid protein (MCP) characterized by a single jelly roll motif. The MCP is the primary component of the capsid, a protein shell that surrounds the genome. Floreovirian extracellular bodies (virions) consist of the genome and the capsid, which is icosahedral in shape. Circular ssDNA viruses in the realm replicate through rolling circle replication, and the dsDNA viruses in the realm use bidirectional theta replication. Among linear ssDNA viruses in the realm, parvoviruses use rolling hairpin replication, whereas bidnaviruses encode a protein-primed DNA polymerase that performs replication.

Floreovirians are believed to be descended from bacterial plasmids that encode the hallmark replication protein of the realm. These plasmids recombined with RNA viruses to obtain capsid proteins. The linear ssDNA and circular dsDNA viruses in the realm are descended from CRESS-DNA viruses. Floreovirians are associated with many diseases in their hosts. Examples include geminiviruses, which cause disease economically important crops, and papillomaviruses, which cause cancers. Anelloviruses, which are ssDNA viruses, infect humans but are not associated with symptoms, an example of commensalism in which they replicate without having an effect on their host. Some floreovirians may become integrated into the genome of their host, such as adeno-associated virus, which is used as a potential vector for gene therapy.

The earliest reference to a disease caused by a floreovirian, and of any plant viral disease, was in 752 by Empress Shotoku of Japan, who wrote about a geminiviral disease of Eupatorium. In modern times, diseases caused by floreovirians began to be recognized in the 1800s, and the viruses themselves started to be identified in the second half of the 1900s. In the 21st century, rolling circle amplification and metagenomics have emerged as the main ways of discovering floreovirians. The realm Floreoviria was originally named Monodnaviria and established in 2020. Monodnaviria was split in 2026 into four realms, corresponding to its four kingdoms, after evidence showed the kingdoms had different evolutionary origins, so Floreoviria encompasses the monodnavirian kingdom Shotokuvirae.

== Classification ==
Floreoviria is monotypic down to the rank of its sole kingdom, Shotokuvirae, which has three phyla. This is shown hereafter:

- Realm: Floreoviria
  - Kingdom: Shotokuvirae
    - Phylum: Commensaviricota, which contains anelloviruses
    - Phylum: Cossaviricota, which contains bidnaviruses, parvoviruses, and papovaviricetes (papillomaviruses and polyomaviruses)
    - Phylum: Cressdnaviricota, which contains the prototypical members of the realm, including circoviruses and geminiviruses

== Characteristics ==
=== Genome ===
Floreovirians have circular or linear single-stranded DNA (ssDNA) or double-stranded DNA (dsDNA) genomes. Based on genomic characteristics, the prototypical members of Floreoviria are often referred to as CRESS-DNA viruses, which stands for circular, Rep-encoding ssDNA viruses, though this term also includes viruses of other realms. Among the atypical members of Floreoviria, bidnaviruses and parvoviruses have linear ssDNA genomes, and papillomaviruses and polyomaviruses have circular dsDNA genomes. Most ssDNA viruses in the realm have positive-sense genomes, excluding anelloviruses, which have negative-sense genomes, parvoviruses, which vary in their sense, and bidnaviruses, which have ambisense genomes that are split into two molecules. Like bidnaviruses, many CRESS-DNA viruses have multipartite genomes, such as nanoviruses and geminiviruses. Bacilladnaviruses have ssDNA genomes with a portion of the genome as dsDNA.

=== Structure ===
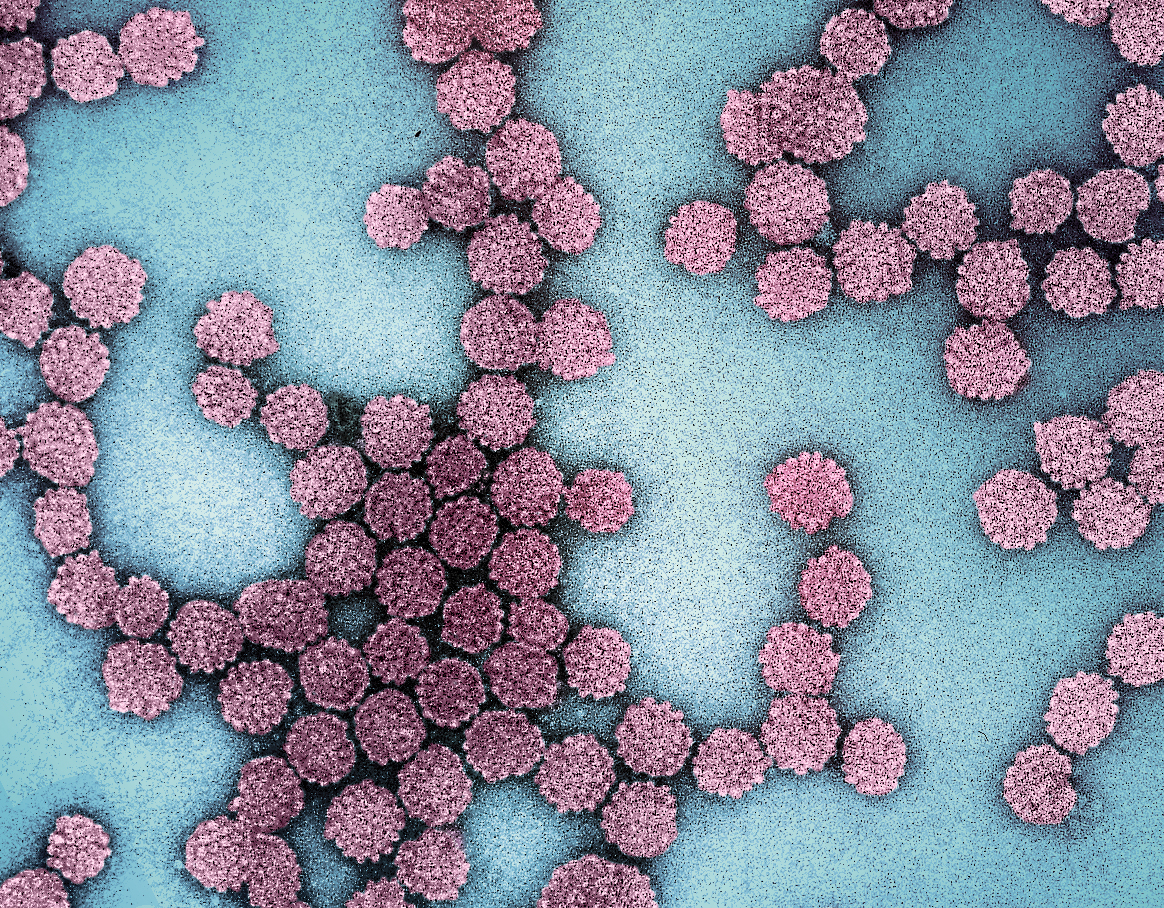
Colorized electron micrograph of human papillomavirus virions that are colored pink

Floreovirian extracellular bodies (virions) consist of the genome and a surrounding protein shell called a capsid. The capsid is icosahedral in shape, usually with T = 1 symmetry but sometimes with T = 3 symmetry. The virions of geminiviruses and bidnaviruses are atypical. Geminivirus capsids are in fact two incomplete capsids fused together. For bidnaviruses, the two molecules of the genome are packaged into two separate capsids. Floreovirian virions are not enveloped.

=== Proteins ===
==== Major capsid protein ====
Floreovirians encode a major capsid protein, numerous copies of which form the capsid. The MCP has a single jelly roll (SJR) motif. This folded structure contains eight beta strands folded into two beta sheets. The strands in each sheet are antiparallel to each other and connected through a series of loops. The two sheets, termed βBIDG and βCHEF, are arranged in such a manner that the βBIDG sheet forms the interior surface of the capsid, while the βCHEF sheet is mostly buried within the walls of the capsid. The loops of the MCP contribute to the features of the capsid's exterior surface and mediate interactions with specific cellular receptors.

==== Replication-initiator protein ====
Most floreovirians encode a replication (Rep) protein that contains a HUH superfamily endonuclease domain and a superfamily 3 (SF3) helicase domain. The HUH endonuclease domain is at the start of the protein (N-terminus) and the SF3 helicase domain at the end (C-terminus). Endonucleases are enzymes that can cleave phosphodiester bonds within a polynucleotide chain. HUH endonucleases contain three conserved motifs: the UUTU motif, which is believed to be involved in recognizing replication origins; the HUH motif, made of two histidine (H) residues separated by a hydrophobic residue (U), which is involved with coordinating Mg^{2+} or Mn^{2+} ions, which are necessary for endonuclease activity; and the YxxK/YxxKY motif, which is involved in dsDNA cleavage and covalent attachment of Rep to DNA through its tyrosine (Y) residue. The HUH endonuclease of floreovirians is often called the replication-initiator protein, or Rep, because of its role in commencing replication. The SF3 helicase unwinds dsDNA replicative forms and, for some floreovirians, packages genomes into empty capsids. It is characterized by three motifs that are presumed to allow Rep to have helicase activity during DNA elongation: Walker A, Walker B, and motif C. An arginine finger motif that may fuel helicase activity is also common.

=== Replication ===
Circular ssDNA viruses in Floreoviria replicate their genomes through rolling circle replication. This process begins with a host cell's DNA polymerase replicating the ssDNA genome to produce a double-stranded form. The viral endonuclease (Rep) then recognizes a replication origin, binds to a specific site there, and nicks the positive-sense strand. In the process, Rep binds to the 5′-end ("five prime end") of the nicked strand and releases the 3′-end ("three prime end") of the nicked strand as a free hydroxyl (-OH) to prime DNA synthesis. A host DNA polymerase replicates the genome, extending the 3′-end of the positive strand using the negative strand as a template for DNA replication, gradually displacing the original nicked strand. After one round of replication around the genome, the replicated strand is nicked again, which creates a free circular ssDNA genome that may be packaged into newly constructed capsids or converted to dsDNA form for transcription or further replication.

Parvoviruses, which have linear ssDNA genomes, replicate their genomes through rolling hairpin replication. For parvoviruses, the ends of their genomes have hairpin loops that repeatedly unfold and refold during replication to change the direction of DNA synthesis to move back and forth along the genome, which produces numerous copies of the genome in a continuous process. Individual genomes are excised from this replicative molecule by the replication initiator protein. Instead of the HUH endonuclease, bidnaviruses encode their own protein-primed DNA polymerase that replicates the genome in place of a host DNA polymerase. Circular dsDNA viruses in the realm, papillomaviruses and polyomaviruses, use bidirectional theta replication. For these viruses, the HUH endonuclease domain of Rep has been inactivated, and it functions as a replication origin recognition domain. For anelloviruses, the ancestral Rep protein has been lost, and they do not appear to encode replication proteins, so they rely entirely on host DNA replisomes for replication.

=== Evolution ===
Floreovirians have a relatively high rate of substitution mutations. The reason for this is not fully understood, as floreovirians are replicated by host DNA polymerases, but is proposed to be at least partly because of oxidative damage caused to individual bases in ssDNA. Genetic recombination is also frequent in CRESS-DNA viruses, causing new lineages to emerge. One example is Porcine circovirus 3, which, as a result of recombination, encodes a porcine circovirus Rep protein and an avian circovirus capsid protein. Recombination can occur when polymerases switch templates when a gene on an ambisense strand is replicated and transcribed at the same time. Among floreovirians, recombination has been observed in anelloviruses, circoviruses, and parvoviruses. Reassortment, in which genomic molecules from different viruses mix together to form new hybrid progeny, has been observed in multipartite plant CRESS-DNA viruses.

== Phylogenetics ==
Outside the realm, the two-domain HUH endonuclease-SF3 helicase replication protein encoded by floreovirians is only found in a group of bacterial plasmids. Consequently, virologists believe that floreovirians inherit their replication protein from this group of plasmids. These plasmids became viruses by recombining with a complementary DNA copy of a positive-sense RNA virus to obtain capsid proteins. In some lineages, the ancestral SJR MCP has been replaced with an unrelated one, likely as a result of recombining with single-stranded RNA viruses. The MCPs of bacilladnaviruses and cruciviruses, for example, appear to be related to RNA viruses of the families Nodaviridae and Tombusviridae, respectively.

Within the realm, the phyla Commensaviricota and Cossaviricota are descended from the ancestral Cressdnaviricota lineage. Parvoviruses (Cossaviricota) appear to have evolved from CRESS-DNA viruses, but their Rep proteins have lost the ability to join DNA strands together because they remain attached to the 5′ ends of nicked DNA strands after nicking. Bidnaviruses and papovaviricetes (both in Cossaviricota), in turn, are thought to be descended from parvoviruses. For bidnaviruses, their HUH endonuclease was replaced with a family B DNA polymerase while integrating into a polintovirus genome. Papovaviricetes have had their HUH endonuclease domain inactivated, which changed it to a DNA-binding domain. Anelloviruses (Commensaviricota) are believed to have evolved from a circovirus-like virus due to similarities in their capsid proteins.

== Interactions with hosts ==
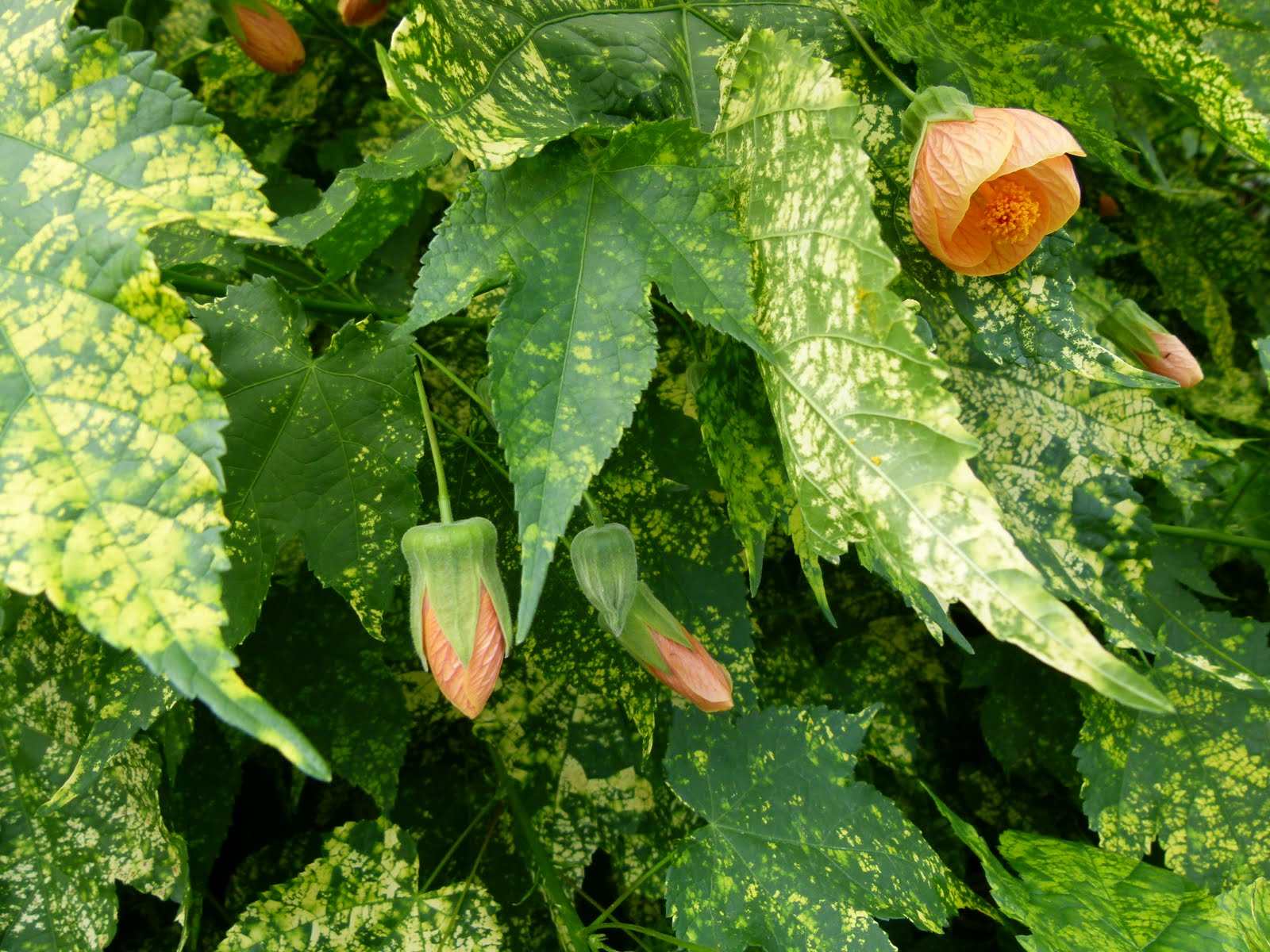
A plant infected with Abutilon mosaic virus showing yellowing leaves

=== Disease ===
Floreovirians infect eukaryotes and are associated with a variety of diseases. Among cressdnaviricots, circoviruses infect animals and include porcine circovirus, which causes respiratory, enteric, and reproductive symptoms in domestic pigs. Plant viruses in the families Geminiviridae and Nanoviridae infect economically important crops and reduce agricultural productivity. This includes Tomato yellow leaf curl virus (TYLCV), which causes severe disease in tomatoes, African cassava mosaic virus, which causes a mosaic disease in cassava that can cause complete loss of crops, and Banana bunchy top virus, which is the most destructive banana virus. Some plant CRESS-DNA viruses, such as TYLCV, have been observed to migrate, spreading from one region to another over time.

Among cossaviricots, parvoviruses cause various diseases, including a lethal infection in canids and fifth disease in humans. Polyomaviruses usually do not cause disease in healthy individuals, but can cause symptoms in the immunocompromised, including progressive multifocal leukoencephalopathy and Merkel cell carcinoma. Papillomaviruses are strongly associated with cancers of the cervix, anus, vulva, vagina, penis, and oropharynx. Anelloviruses (commensaviricots) are part of the human virome but are not associated with disease, so they are considered to be an example of a commensal relationship in which they are able to replicate without affecting their host. They do, however, sometimes cause disease in animals, such as chicken anemia virus, which causes an immunosuppressive disease in chickens.

=== Endogenization ===
Floreovirians may become integrated into the genome of their host. This acts as a form of horizontal gene transfer between unrelated life forms, in which viruses provide genes to cellular life. Because cells do not encode the floreovirian Rep protein, searching for it can identify instances of integration. Geminiviruses, circoviruses, and parvoviruses have all been observed having been integrated into host genomes, and CRESS-DNA virus-like sequences have been found in the genomes of animals, plants, fungi, and protists. The most widely studied instance of floreovirian integration is of adeno-associated virus, a parvovirus, due to its use as a potential vector in gene therapy. AAV's Rep protein preferentially recognizes and binds to a sequence in the human genome on chromosome 19, facilitating integration of the AAV genome into the human genome.

== History ==
The earliest reference to a disease caused by a floreovirian, and of any plant viral disease, was made in a poem written in 752 by Empress Shotoku of Japan. The poem describes a yellowing or vein clearing disease of Eupatorium plants, now believed to have been caused by the geminivirus Eupatorium yellow vein virus. In modern times, plant viral diseases were noted in the 1800s, including Abutilon mosaic virus, which causes a mosaic pattern on ornamental Abutilon plants, a highly-desired pattern in mid-1800s Europe. Also that century, a circovirus infection that caused balding in birds was observed in Australia in 1888. The first animal CRESS-DNA virus to be characterized was porcine circovirus, and in 1977, the first genome of a eukaryotic circular ssDNA virus was detailed, that of Bean golden mosaic virus. Beginning in the 1970s, the families of related viruses in Floreoviria began to be organized, the first of which was for parvoviruses, officially recognized in 1975.

In the early 21st century, rolling circle amplification emerged as the primary way of discovering CRESS-DNA viruses, followed by metagenomics starting in the 2010s. The relation between CRESS-DNA viruses was resolved from 2015 to 2017, which led to the establishment of the kingdom Shotokuvirae in the former realm Monodnaviria in 2020. Monodnaviria was established to accommodate all RCR ssDNA viruses that encode a HUH endonuclease, as well as their descendants. Anelloviruses were not originally included in Shotokuvirae, but were added in 2025. A year later, Monodnaviria was split based on evidence that not all viruses in the former realm share common ancestry. With the split, the realm Monodnaviria was renamed Floreoviria and encompassed only shotokuviraens. The other three kingdoms of Monodnaviria are now classified into the three realms Efunaviria, Pleomoviria, and Volvereviria. Each realm corresponds to the four former kingdoms of Monodnaviria. (Note: The realm Efunaviria encompasses the former Monodnaviria kingdom Loebvirae, the realm Floreoviria encompasses the former Monodnaviria kingdom Shotokuvirae, the realm Pleomoviria encompasses the former Monodnaviria kingdom Trapavirae, and the realm Volvereviria encompasses the former Monodnaviria kingdom Sangervirae. Each former Monodnaviria kingdom still exists as kingdoms in their respective realms.)

=== Etymology ===
Floreoviria takes the first part of its name from the Latin word "floreo", which means blossom, bloom, and flourish. This refers to the bloom of diversity of viruses in the realm, as they have varied genome structures, replication methods, and virion structures. The second part, -viria, is the suffix used for virus realms. The sole kingdom in the realm, Shotokuvirae, is named after Japanese Empress Shotoku, also called Kōken, who wrote a poem about a plant disease likely caused by a geminivirus. That poem is considered to be the first written account of a plant virus disease. The second part of the kingdom's name is the suffix used for virus kingdoms, -virae.

== See also ==
- List of higher virus taxa
