= Geplafuvirales =

Virus classification
- (unranked): Virus
- Realm: Monodnaviria
- Kingdom: Shotokuvirae
- Phylum: Cressdnaviricota
- Class: Repensiviricetes
- Order: Geplafuvirales

Families
- See text

Order of viruses

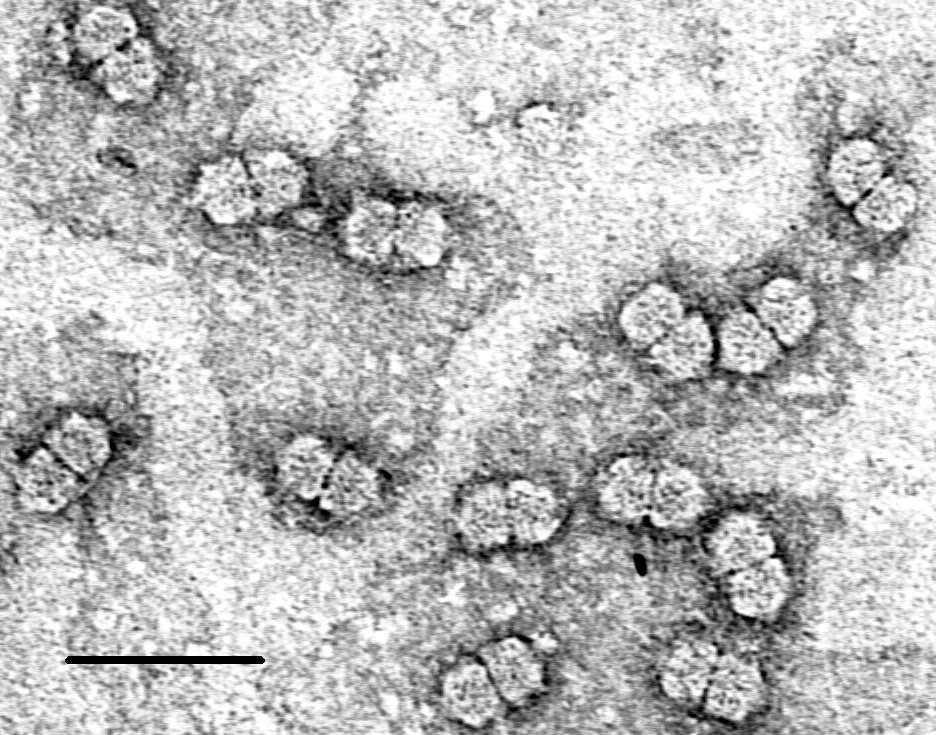
Maize streak virus

Geplafuvirales is an order of viruses.

== Families ==
The following families are recognized:

- Geminiviridae
- Genomoviridae
- Geplanaviridae
