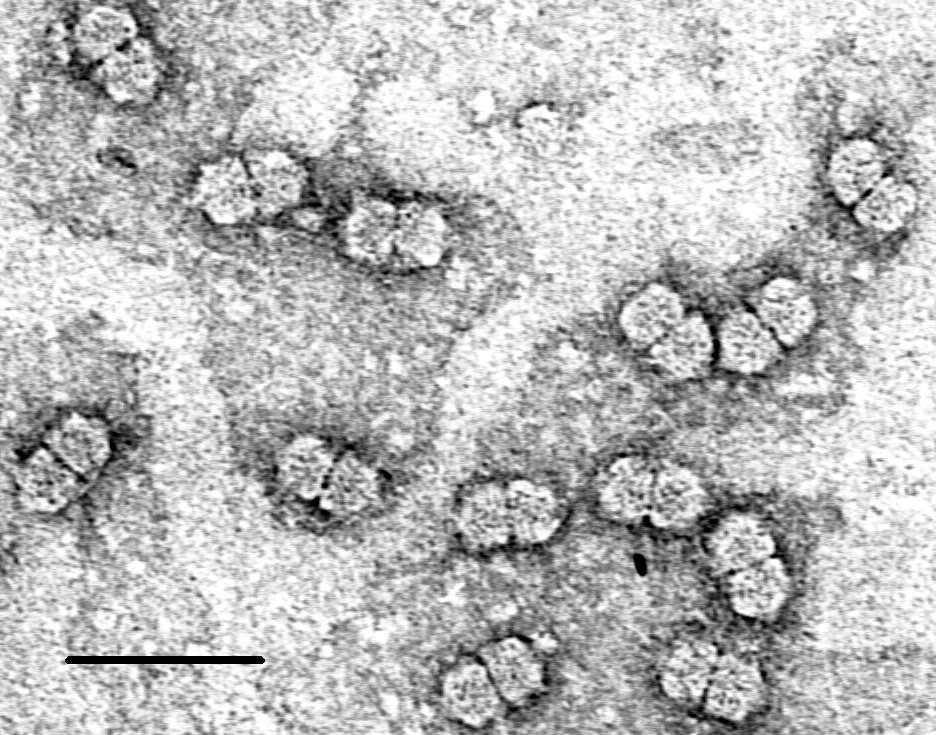
- Virions of Maize streak virus

Virus classification
- (unranked): Virus
- Realm: Monodnaviria
- Kingdom: Shotokuvirae
- Phylum: Cressdnaviricota

Classes
- See text

= Cressdnaviricota =

Phylum of viruses

Cressdnaviricota is a phylum of viruses with small, circular single-stranded DNA genomes and encoding rolling circle replication-initiation proteins with the N-terminal HUH endonuclease and C-terminal superfamily 3 helicase domains. While the replication-associated proteins are homologous among viruses within the phylum, the capsid proteins are very diverse and have presumably been acquired from RNA viruses on multiple independent occasions. Nevertheless, all cressdnaviruses for which structural information is available appear to contain the jelly-roll fold.

== Taxonomy ==
The following classes are recognized:

- Arfiviricetes
- Repensiviricetes
