= Mink enteritis virus =

Virus classification
- (unranked): Virus
- Realm: Monodnaviria
- Kingdom: Shotokuvirae
- Phylum: Cossaviricota
- Class: Quintoviricetes
- Order: Piccovirales
- Family: Parvoviridae
- Genus: Protoparvovirus
- Species: Carnivore protoparvovirus 1
- Virus: Mink enteritis virus

Species of virus

Mink enteritis virus (MEV) is a strain of Carnivore protoparvovirus 1 that infects mink and causes enteritis. Like all parvoviruses, it is a small (18–26 nm), spherical virus, and has a single-stranded DNA genome. The signs and symptoms of enteritis usually appear within 4–7 days after infection. The virus replicates in the cells of the crypt epithelium in the duodenum and jejunum and, to a lesser extent the ileum, colon and caecum. The severity of the disease is directly related to necrosis of the crypt epithelium.

Virus enteritis of mink was recognized first in 1947 when epizootics occurred among ranch mink in southern Canada. The disease subsequently spread to the United States and Europe.

== Types ==
There are at least three types of MEV. From an antigen perspective, MEV-1 is indistinguishable from feline panleukopenia virus (FPLV), so it's usually identified by the host it's isolated from. MEV-2 is similar to a blue fox parvovirus.

== Signs and symptoms ==
Clinical signs include anorexia, vomiting and severe diarrhoea. Stools of affected animals usually contain large quantities of mucus and intestinal casts or "plugs" composed of fibrin, mucus and dead cells from intestinal mucosa. In immature animals, anorexia and diarrhoea usually occur about four days after exposure to infectious material and persist for four to seven days. However, infections have been reported in which anorexia was followed by death in 12 to 24 hours without the occurrence of diarrhoea. Mortality of 80 percent or more is possible in newly weaned kits. Mature mink often survive the disease after a period of sickness which may last several weeks. In addition to the overt signs a reduction of the number of leukocytes in the blood may be found in affected animals.

== Treatment ==
Treatment consists of oral rehydration therapy in addition to supportive care. Surgical removal of necrotic tissue may be necessary.

== See also ==
- Canine parvovirus
