= Aleutian disease =

Aleutian mink disease virus

Scientific classification
- (unranked): Virus
- Realm: Floreoviria
- Kingdom: Shotokuvirae
- Phylum: Cossaviricota
- Class: Quintoviricetes
- Order: Piccovirales
- Family: Parvoviridae
- Subfamily: Parvovirinae
- Genus: Amdoparvovirus

Groups included
- Amdoparvovirus carnivoran1; Amdoparvovirus carnivoran9; Amdoparvovirus carnivoran10

Cladistically included but traditionally excluded taxa
- All other amdoparvoviruses

Viral disease of mustelids

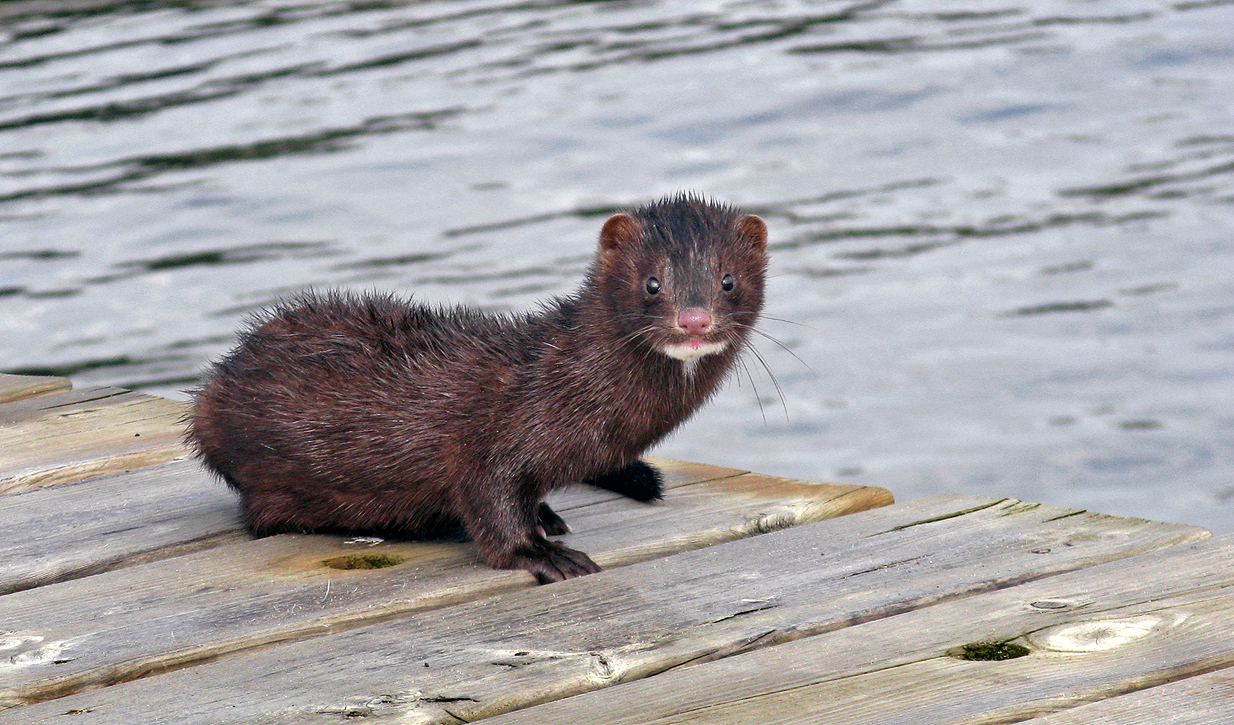
A mink, one of the hosts of Aleutian mink disease virus

Aleutian disease, also known as mink plasmacytosis, is a disease which causes spontaneous abortion and death in minks and ferrets. It is caused by Aleutian mink disease virus (also known as Aleutian disease virus, ADV), a highly contagious parvovirus in the genus Amdoparvovirus. The virus has been found as a natural infection in the Mustelidae family within mink, ferrets, otters, polecats, stone and pine martens and within other carnivores such as skunks, genets, foxes and raccoons. This is most commonly explained as because they all share resources and habitats.

== History ==
Aleutian disease was first recognized in ranch-raised mink in 1956. The disease was so named because it was first found in mink with the Aleutian coat color gene, a gun-metal grey pelt. It was assumed that the disease was a result of poor genetics, but it was later found that minks of all coat colors were susceptible to the disease—but tend to have a lower mortality compared with Aleutian mink.

In the 1960s, it was common practice for mink ranchers to make their own distemper vaccines by homogenizing tissue from distemper-infected mink, making suspensions, and injecting all the mink on their ranch. This practice led to a severe outbreak of AD on a Connecticut ranch, with a mortality of almost 100% in less than 6 months. The disease spread from minks to ferrets, as the two were raised on the same farms.

Aleutian disease has also more currently been found among free range mink throughout Europe and North America. It is speculated that the disease has been transferred from farmed mink to those in the wild. This is most commonly due to escapees within farms, who when free are hybridizing with wild mink. There are different strains of this disease which have been documented.

== Transmission ==
ADV is highly contagious. It is transferred through bodily fluids, and also be transmitted in utero or by direct/indirect contact with those mink who are infected. Once symptoms have been indicated, the mink is certain to die.

== Symptoms ==
A lethal infection in mink, the Aleutian disease virus lies dormant in ferrets until stress or injury allows it to surface. While the parvovirus itself causes little or no harm to the ferret host, the large number of antibodies produced in response to the presence of the virus results in a systemic vasculitis, resulting in eventual renal failure, bone marrow suppression and death. The symptoms are chronic, progressive weight loss, lethargy, splenomegaly (enlarged spleen), anemia, rear leg weakness, seizures and black tarry stool. Additional symptoms include poor reproduction and/or oral bleeding/gastrointestinal bleeding. Lesions can also be found within the pelt depending on the severity of the disease. This virus can unfortunately reduce fitness of wild mink especially, by disturbing both the productivity within adult females and the overall survivor rates of both juveniles and adults. Likewise, in the mink kits that survive, it infects the alveolar cells and ultimately causes respiratory distress, possibly leading to death.

Once symptoms show themselves, the disease progresses rapidly, usually to death within a few months.

== Testing and treatment ==
There is currently no known treatment for Aleutian virus. When evidence of ADV shows in a ferret, it is strongly recommended that a CEP (counterimmunoelectrophoresis) blood test or an IFA (immunofluorescent antibody) test be done. The CEP test is usually faster and less expensive than the IFA test, but the IFA test is more sensitive and can detect the disease in borderline cases. A method had been employed successfully to eliminate this virus from an infected herd of mink. Additionally modern methods such as Real-Time PCR allow for rapid and accurate detection as well as determination of the amount of viron present. Prevention is best accomplished by stopping the spread of ADV. Any new ferret, or those which have been confirmed as serum positive for the virus should be perpetually isolated from other ferrets. All items that may have come into contact with the infected ferret should be cleaned with a 10% bleach solution.

This is a growing concern within mink producers as it is the most significant infectious disease affecting farmed mink worldwide.
