= Infectious hypodermal and hematopoietic necrosis =

Infectious hypodermal and hematopoietic necrosis virus

Virus classification
- (unranked): Virus
- Realm: Floreoviria
- Kingdom: Shotokuvirae
- Phylum: Cossaviricota
- Class: Quintoviricetes
- Order: Piccovirales
- Family: Parvoviridae
- Genus: Shripenbrevirus
- Species: Shripenbrevirus decapod1

Viral disease of Shrimp

Infectious hypodermal and hematopoietic necrosis (IHHN) is a parvoviral disease of penaeid shrimp that causes mass mortality (up to 90%) among the Western blue shrimp (Penaeus stylirostris) and severe deformations in the Pacific white shrimp (P. vannamei). It occurs in Pacific farmed and wild shrimp, but not in wild shrimp on the Atlantic coast of the Americas. The shrimp-farming industry has developed several broodstocks of both P. stylirostris and P. vannamei that are resistant against IHHN infection.

The disease is caused by a single-stranded DNA virus known as Infectious hypodermal and hematopoietic necrosis (IHHN) virus, the smallest of the known penaeid shrimp viruses (22 nm).

== Virology ==
This virus has been classified as Penaeus stylirostris penstyldensovirus 1 (Shripenbrevirus decapod1). The genome is 4.1 kilobases in length. There are three open reading frames in its genome: a left non structural protein (NS1) of 2001 base pairs (bp), a mid non structural protein (NS2) of 1092 bp and a right capsid protein of 990 bp. NSI appears to be a DNA helicase with ATPase activity.

The mutation rate in the genome has been estimated to be ~1.4 × 10^{−4} substitutions/site/year. This is considerably higher than the rate in the double stranded DNA viruses and similar to that found in RNA viruses. It is also similar to the rate found in other single stranded DNA viruses.
