= RHR =

RHR may stand for

- Rabbis for Human Rights
- Radical History Review, a journal
- Right-hand rule
- Rohr, Inc., former NYSE ticker symbol
- Rolling hairpin replication
- Resting heart rate
- Ryan Hunter-Reay, American race car driver
- Residual Heat Removal System, a shutdown and safety system in nuclear reactors
