= Aleutian =

Aleutian may refer to:

- Aleut people, the indigenous people of the Aleutian Islands, the Pribilof Islands, the Shumagin Islands, and the far western part of the Alaska Peninsula in Alaska and of Kamchatka Krai, Russia
- Aleutian disease, a disease in minks and ferrets
- Aleutian Islands, a chain of islands in Alaska
- Aleut language, the language of the Aleut people
- Alaska Peninsula, also called the Aleutian Peninsula, leading from the Alaska state mainland to the Aleutian Islands
- Aleutian Range, a mountain range in Alaska
- Aleutian Trench (or Aleutian Trough), a deep in the North Pacific Ocean at the western end of the Aleutian Islands
- SS Aleutian, an American passenger ship

== See also ==
- Aleut (disambiguation)
