= Cerebellar hypoplasia (non-human) =

Underdevelopment of the cerebellum in animals

Cerebellar hypoplasia is a neurological condition in which the cerebellum is smaller than usual or not completely developed. It has been reported in many animal species.

== Function and development of the cerebellum ==
The cerebellum is the brain's main control center for planning, adjusting, and executing movements of the body, the limbs and the eyes. It plays a major role in several forms of motor learning, including balance and posture.

In the past, the evidence for a role for the cerebellum in cognitive functions was rather weak. However, investigations into the cognitive neuroscience of the cerebellum are rapidly advancing, extending far beyond the traditional view. For humans, current theories support the theory that what the cerebellum does to sensorimotor and vestibular control, it also does to cognition, emotion, and autonomic function. How it functions in cognition, emotion, or autonomic function in animals is still largely unknown. In 2012, a study in mice provided direct evidence that subtle disruptions in cerebellar architecture can have pronounced effects on behaviors typically associated with "autistic-like" behavior.

Development of the cerebellum starts in a fetus in utero and, depending on the species, may continue for some period after birth. Postnatal development periods vary by species including: dogs up to 75 days, cats to 84 days, calves up to six months.

== Cerebellar hypoplasia in cats ==
=== Symptoms ===
Symptoms of cerebellar hypoplasia in cats include swaying, head tremors, uncoordinated walking, and hypermetria.

=== Overview ===
The severity of the condition is dependent upon the time of infection and the portion of the cerebellum that is affected. The condition is not usually diagnosed by a test, but rather by observation of characteristic symptoms in the cat's behavior. There is no treatment for this because of how it arises, but it may be prevented by vaccinating mothers against panleukopenia (a white blood cell infection) before becoming pregnant.

=== Differences in lifestyle ===
There are very minor differences to a cat's life caused by cerebellar hypoplasia. Usually, they are more prone to falls and being attacked. A simple solution is keeping them indoors. The condition is not infectious in any way. Some accommodations that might be needed are easier access to the litter box or higher food and water bowls.

== Cerebellar hypoplasia in dogs ==
=== Symptoms ===
Symptoms of cerebellar hypoplasia in dogs include goose-stepping, stumbling, eye flicking, stiff and wide-set legs, and a curved spine.

== Causes ==
A hereditary link to cerebellar hypoplasia has been established in some animals, including certain breeds of cows and dogs.

There are numerous potential causes for cerebellar hypoplasia. It is suspected that the most common cause is animal parvoviruses. In dogs and cats specifically, it is thought to be most likely related to in utero viral infections, toxins or genetic disorders.

In dogs, along with parvoviruses, the condition can be caused by canine herpes virus. The time frame during which a dog may be affected by cerebellar hypoplasia begins in the prenatal period and continues to the age of four weeks. Some non-infectious causes include injuries, heredity, and random events during development.

In cattle, cerebellar hypoplasia is the most frequent result of bovine virus diarrhea virus. This happens because the virus destroys brain cells in the immature cattle fetus. Loss of cells specifically in the cerebellum of the cattle fetus results in lesions that reduce the size of the cerebellum and cause cerebellar hypoplasia.

Feline panleukopenia (a.k.a. feline distemper or Feline Parvo) virus has long been known to cause cerebellar hypoplasia in neonatal kittens through in utero or perinatal infection. In utero, the virus can pass from the dam (mother) to the developing fetus and may then disrupt the development of its cerebellum by hindering cell division. This can happen when the dam is actively infected with the virus or given a modified-live feline parvovirus vaccine when pregnant. Kittens are particularly vulnerable to cerebellar hypoplasia, in particular when the protective antibodies present in their mothers' milk are no longer present at four to twelve weeks of age. Unvaccinated adult cats are also prone to developing the condition.

Other possible causes, if they occur during the development period of the cerebellum and thus inhibit its growth, include:

- Hypoxia
- Malnutrition, either from a lack of adequate critical nutrients or an inability to absorb them
- Mycotic infection
- Protozoal infection (e.g. toxoplasmosis)
- Rickettsial infection (most are spread through ticks, mites, fleas, or lice)
- Traumatic brain injury
- Viral infection (e.g. feline infectious peritonitis)

== Diagnosis ==
The veterinarian performs a physical exam and a neurological assessment to diagnose cerebellar hypoplasia. They will perform the physical exam to rule out other possibilities, which include:

- Ataxia: vestibular or sensory
- Feline infectious peritonitis
- Lysosomal storage diseases

If needed, an MRI can affirm the presence of the condition, though this is not always necessary due to the usual lack of severe impacts on quality of life with cerebellar hypoplasia.

== Treatment ==
=== Special considerations ===
In 2004, a study was published that linked ketamine to post-anesthetic cerebellar dysfunction in cats. Eleven cats that did not have any indication of cerebellar deficits before surgery developed deficits post-surgery. All of these cats were Persian crossbreeds. Ketamine can cause erratic and spastic, jerky movements and muscle tremors and is slow to be metabolized out of the system. The 2018 American Association of Feline Practitioner's Feline Anesthesia Guidelines lists numerous alternatives. Gas anesthesia offers a number of advantages in many circumstances. In cats, rapid recovery is its primary advantage.

=== Possible accommodations ===
For a house pet with cerebellar hypoplasia, accommodations for its condition may include limiting its access to stairs, using an animal wheelchair, installing carpets and rugs to prevent slipping, and improving the ease of access to food and water bowls. The basis of care for these pets is making it easier and safer for them to move around and live as normally as possible.

== Prognosis ==
The level of severity and mode of infection (if any) both play a role in determining the prognosis for animals that have cerebellar hypoplasia. At worst, the animal will not survive ex-utero; at best, the animal will live for the length of time that is considered normal for its species. If the root cause of the cerebellar hypoplasia impacted other parts of the developing brain or body, the overall health and life-span may or may not be impacted. For instance, feline fetuses infected in utero by FPLV that survive ex-utero, and kittens less than a few weeks of age that become infected with it, can also have retinal dysplasia and optic neuropathy.The symptoms of cerebellar hypoplasia can also affect the prognosis of the animal. In severe cases, mobility issues can negatively affect the quality of life outcomes associated with the animal. In most cases, the symptoms of cerebellar hypoplasia can cause the animal to become more vulnerable to injuries or attacks. Most animals affected by cerebellar hypoplasia adapt to their disability but will need extra support and care to survive.

== See also ==
- Cerebellar hypoplasia – the condition as it occurs in human beings
