= MVM =

MVM may refer to:

- MVM Entertainment, a British distributor of Japanese animation
- MVM Group, a Hungarian electricity company
- MVM, Inc., a security contractor in the United States
- MVM (TV channel), a Portuguese television channel
- Maharishi Vedic Medicine
- Maharishi Vidya Mandir Schools, a group of private schools in India
- The IATA code for Machias Valley Airport in Machias, Maine.
- Mann vs. Machine, a Team Fortress 2 game mode
- MetroCard Vending Machine, a ticket machine used on the New York City Subway and Port Authority Trans-Hudson
- Minute Virus of Mice, the type species of the genus Parvovirus
- Modiran Vehicle Manufacturing Company, an Iranian car firm
- Muniyandi Vilangial Moonramandu, a 2008 Tamil film
- MVM, magister utriusque militiae, a Roman military office, literally master of both forces, i.e. cavalry and infantry
- MVM, (Man Woman Society) was a Dutch feminist action group
- MVM 110, an Iranian-assembled Chinese budget car
