= Rolling hairpin replication =

AAV rolling hairpin replication

Rolling hairpin replication (RHR) is a unidirectional, strand displacement form of DNA replication used by parvoviruses, a group of viruses that constitute the family Parvoviridae. Parvoviruses have linear, single-stranded DNA (ssDNA) genomes in which the coding portion of the genome is flanked by telomeres at both ends that form hairpin loops. During RHR, these hairpins unfold and refold to change the direction of DNA replication to progress in a continuous manner back and forth across the genome. This creates a replicative form (RF) molecule that contains numerous copies of the genome. Progeny genomes are then excised from the RF molecule by excisions made by the viral replication initiator protein. RHR is similar to rolling circle replication and can be considered a variation of it used for linear ssDNA genomes.

Before RHR begins, a host cell DNA polymerase converts the genome to a duplex form in which the coding portion is double-stranded and connected to the terminal hairpins. Messenger RNA (mRNA) that encodes the viral initiator protein is then transcribed and translated to synthesize the protein. The initiator protein commences RHR by binding to and nicking the genome in a region at the base of the hairpin called the origin while establishing a replication fork. Nicking leads to the hairpin unfolding into a linear, extended form. The telomere is then replicated and both strands of the telomere refold back in on themselves to their original hairpin forms, which repositions the replication fork to switch templates to the other strand and move in the opposite direction to the other end of the RF molecule.

Parvoviruses vary in whether both hairpins are the same or different. Homotelomeric parvoviruses such as adeno-associated viruses (AAVs), i.e. those that have similar or identical telomeres, have both ends replicated by terminal resolution, the previously described process. Heterotelomeric parvoviruses such as minute virus of mice (MVM), i.e. those that have different telomeres, have one end replicated by terminal resolution and the other end by an asymmetric process called junction resolution. During asymmetric junction resolution, the duplex extended form of the telomere reorganizes into a cruciform-shaped junction, which enables the correct orientation of the telomere to be replicated off the lower arm of the cruciform. Because of their means of resolving termini, homotelomeric parvoviruses usually package an equal number of positive- and negative-sense strands into progeny capsids, while heterotelomeric parvoviruses typically package negative-sense strands.

== Introduction ==
=== Parvoviruses ===
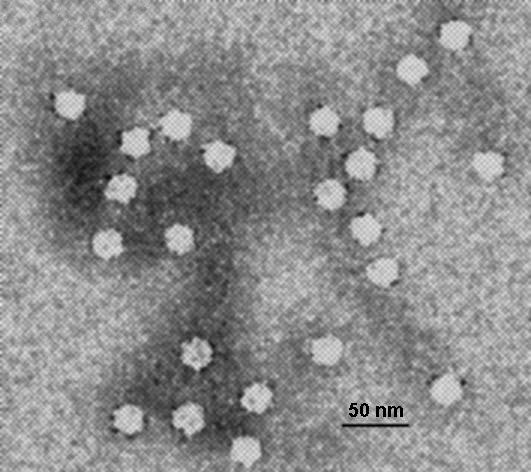
Canine parvovirus virions

Parvoviruses are a family of DNA viruses, family Parvoviridae, that have single-stranded DNA (ssDNA) genomes enclosed in rugged, icosahedral capsids that are 18–26 nanometers (nm) in diameter. They have linear genomes with short terminal sequences at each end of the genome. These termini are imperfect palindromes of nucleotides able to fold into structures called hairpins, or hairpin loops. (Note: Hairpins are double-stranded structures at the ends of single-stranded genomes in which a single strand folds back on itself to create a basepaired structure that resembles a hairpin. Hairpins may be part of inverted terminal repeats, which are sequences in nucleic acid that have two parts that are inverted versions of each other. Because the bases of the repeat are complementary to each other, these sequences can assemble into hairpins. Often times, they are often involved in viral transcription and replication.) Varying from virus to virus, the coding region of the genome is 4–6 kilobases (kb) in length, and the termini are 116–550 nucleotides in length each. The telomere sequences give rise to origins of replication and contain most of the cis-acting information needed for DNA replication and packaging. Parvoviruses have two genes: rep on the "left" half, which encodes non-structural proteins involved in replication and transcription, and cap on the "right" half, which encodes capsid proteins.

Parvovirus genomes may be either positive-sense or negative-sense. Some species, such as adeno-associated viruses (AAV) like AAV2, package a roughly equal number of positive-sense and negative-sense strands into virions. Others, such as minute virus of mice (MVM), mainly package negative-sense strands, while others have varying proportions. To clarify this disparity, the 5′ end (pronounced "five prime end") of the strand that encodes the non-structural proteins (the positive-sense strand) is called the left end, and the 3′ end (pronounced "three prime end") is called the right end. For the negative-sense strand, the 3′ end is the left end and the 5′ end is the right end. AAV and MVM have been the main viruses used to study parvovirus replication.

=== Rolling hairpin replication ===
Parvoviruses replicate their genomes through a process called rolling hairpin replication (RHR), which is a unidirectional, strand displacement form of DNA replication. Before replication, the coding portion of the ssDNA genome is converted to a double-strand DNA (dsDNA) form, which is then cleaved by a viral protein to initiate replication. Sequential unfolding and refolding of the hairpins acts to reverse the direction of synthesis, which allows replication to go back and forth along the genome to synthesize a continuous duplex replicative form (RF) DNA intermediate. The viral replication initiator protein then excises progeny ssDNA genomes from the RF intermediate. Between genera, parvoviral hairpins vary significantly, but they are well conserved within genera.

Parvovirus genomes have distinct starting points of replication that contain palindromic DNA sequences. These sequences are able to alternate between inter- and intrastrand basepairing throughout replication, and they serve as self-priming telomeres at each end of the DNA molecule. They also contain two key sites necessary for replication that are used by the initiator protein: a binding site and a cleavage site. Telomere sequences have significant complexity and diversity, suggesting that they perform additional functions for many species. In general, however, they have the same basic structure: imperfect palindromes in which a fully or primarily basepaired region terminates into axial symmetry. These termini can fold into a variety of structures such as a Y-shaped structure and a cruciform-shaped structure. During replication, they act as hinges that unfold and refold the hairpin, enabled by the imperfectly basepaired or partial cruciform regions surrounding the axis. Hairpin unfolding and refolding require the viral replication initiator protein, which binds site-specifically to duplex motifs in telomeres and contains a superfamily 3 (SF3) helicase domain to help melt dsDNA. (Note: DNA melting, or denaturation, is the dissociation of duplex DNA molecules into two separate single strands of DNA due to heat.)

Some parvoviruses, such as AAV2, are homotelomeric, which means the two palindromic telomeres are similar or identical. Replication at each terminal ending is therefore symmetrical. Other parvoviruses, such as MVM, are heterotelomeric, which means they have two physically different telomeres. As a result, heterotelomeric parvoviruses have a more complex replication cycle since the two telomeres are replicated through different processes. Homotelomeric parvoviruses replicate both ends through a process called terminal resolution, whereas heterotelomeric parvoviruses replicate one end by terminal resolution and the other end by an asymmetric process called junction resolution. Replication occurs in two phases: the first amplifies the number of copies of the genome by creating long palindromic concatemers, and the second involves excision and displacement of individual progeny ssDNA genomes from the concatemer for further replication or packaging into progeny capsids.

== Summary ==
The general process of rolling hairpin replication can be summarized as follows:

- 1. The coding portion of the genome is replicated by a host DNA polymerase, starting from the 3′ end of the 3′ hairpin, which acts as a primer. Replication continues until the newly synthesized strand is connected (ligated) to the 5′ end of the 5′ hairpin, which produces a duplex DNA molecule that has two strands of the coding portion of the genome, called a replicative form (RF) molecule.
- 2. mRNA that encodes the viral replication initiator protein is transcribed and subsequently translated to synthesize the protein.
- 3. The initiator protein binds to and, with its endonuclease activity, cleaves the DNA within a region called the origin, which results in a hairpin unfolding into a linear, extended form. At the same time, the initiator protein establishes a replication fork with its helicase activity.
- 4. The extended-form hairpin is replicated to create an inverted copy of the unfolded hairpin on the newly synthesized strand.
- 5. The two strands of that end refold back into two hairpins, which repositions the replication fork to switch templates and move in the opposite direction.
- 6. DNA replication continues in a linear manner from one end of the replicative molecule to the other.
- 7. Upon reaching the other end, that end's hairpin is unfolded and refolded to replicate the hairpin and once again swap templates and change the direction of replication. This back-and-forth replication is continually repeated, which produces a concatemer of numerous copies of the genome.
- 8. The viral initiator protein excises individual genomic strands of DNA from the replicative concatemer by nicking origins, which attaches the initiator protein to the 5′ end of the nicked strand and frees a 3′ hydroxyl (-OH), which can prime replication, while displacing a progeny ssDNA strand.
- 9. Excised ssDNA genomes are packaged into newly constructed viral capsids, or their telomeres may fold into hairpins as they are recycled for further replication.
- 10. RF molecules are able to support multiple replication forks, which may be established at nicked origins. For homotelomeric parvoviruses, both telomeres are replicated by terminal resolution after nicking, while for heterotelomeric parvoviruses, one end is replicated through terminal resolution after nicking and one end by junction resolution after nicking.

== Preparation for replication ==
The viral replication initiator protein is attached on the outside of the virion to the 5′ end of the viral genome on the inside by a tether about 24 nucleotides in length. During cell entry, this tether is cleaved off to be restored later, which releases the initiator protein from the genomic molecule. After cell entry, virions accumulate in the cell nucleus with the genome still contained in the capsid. These capsids may be reconfigured to an open, or "transitioned", state during entry. How and when the genome leaves the capsid is unclear. For AAV, it has been suggested that nuclear factors disassemble the capsid, but analysis of MVM implies that the genome is ejected in a 3′-to-5′ direction from an opening in the capsid called a portal.

Naked ssDNA is likely to be unstable, perceived as foreign by the host cell, or improperly replicated by host DNA repair. For that reason, the genome must either be converted rapidly to its less obstructive, more stable duplex form or retained within the capsid until it is uncoated during the host cell's DNA synthesis phase (S-phase). Parvoviruses were traditionally thought to wait for S-phase, but more recent evidence suggests that parvoviral nonstructural proteins may influence the host cell cycle. Until S-phase begins, virions are retained in the nucleus and may make use of certain strategies to evade host defense mechanisms to protect their genomes until S-phase, though it is unclear how this occurs. Since the genome is packaged as ssDNA, creation of a complementary strand to create a double-stranded DNA molecule is necessary before gene expression.

DNA polymerases are only able to synthesize DNA in a 5′ to 3′ direction, and they require a basepaired primer to begin synthesis. Parvoviruses address these limitations by using their termini as primers for complementary strand synthesis. For MVM, this is the left-end telomere, which folds back on itself to create a 3′-OH end of the left-hand (3′) terminus that pairs with an internal base. This primes initial DNA synthesis for a host DNA polymerase to convert the ssDNA genome to its first dsDNA form. This is a duplex molecule in which both strands are covalently cross-linked to each other at the left end by a copy of the telomere. Synthesis of this duplex form precedes expression of the initiator protein so that when the replication fork during initial complementary strand synthesis reaches the right-hand (5′) end, it does not displace and copy the right-end hairpin. This allows the new DNA strand's 3′ end to be ligated to the right hairpin's 5′ end by a host ligase, thereby creating a covalently continuous duplex molecule. Furthermore, cellular machinery is unable to melt and copy the 5′ hairpin, so expression of the initiator protein must precede replication. During this step, the tether sequence that was present before viral entry into the cell is resynthesized.

== Essential viral proteins and initiation ==
Once an infected cell enters S-phase, parvovirus genomes are converted to their first duplex form by host replication machinery. mRNA that encodes non-structural (NS) proteins is then transcribed from this molecule, starting from the viral promoter (P4 for MVM). One of these NS proteins is usually called NS1 but also Rep1 or Rep68/78 for the genus Dependoparvovirus, which AAV belongs to. NS1 is a site-specific DNA-binding protein that acts as the replication initiator protein by creating breaks in individual DNA strands (i.e. "nicking" by an endonuclease or a nickase enzyme). This nicking activity is used at duplex origin sequences to mediate excision of the ends of the genome from duplex RF intermediates through a transesterification reaction. Key components of NS1 include a site-specific, single-strand-specific His-hydrophobic-His (HUH) endonuclease domain toward the start (N-terminus) of the protein and a 3′-to-5′ SF3 helicase toward the end (C-terminus) that melts DNA before nicking, as well as ATPase activity for obtaining energy from adenosine triphosphate (ATP). It binds to ssDNA, RNA, and site-specifically to duplex DNA at reiterations of the nucleotide sequence 5′-ACCA-3′ or 5′-TGGT-3′. These sequences are present in replication origins and repeated throughout the genome in mostly degenerate forms.

To initiate replication, NS1 nicks the covalently-closed right-end telomere with a transesterification reaction that releases a basepaired 3′ nucleotide as a free hydroxyl. This reaction is assisted by a host high mobility group 1/2 (HMG1/2) family DNA-binding protein and is made in the replication origin, OriR, which is created from sequences in and immediately adjacent to the right hairpin. The left-end telomere of MVM contains sequences that can create a replication origin in a future duplex intermediate. These sequences, however, are inactive in the hairpin terminus of the first monomeric duplex molecule, so NS1 always initiates replication at MVM's right end. The 3′-OH that is freed by nicking becomes the primer for the DNA polymerase to start complementary strand synthesis while NS1 remains covalently attached to the 5′ end through a phosphotyrosine bond. Consequently, a copy of NS1 remains attached to the 5′ end of all RF and progeny DNA throughout replication, packaging, and virion release. NS1 is only able to bind to this specific site by assembling into homodimers or higher order multimers, which happens naturally with the addition of ATP that is likely mediated by NS1's helicase domain. NS1 can exist in various oligomeric states, but it most likely assembles into hexamers to fulfill the functions of both the endonuclease domain and helicase domain.

Starting from the location at the nick, it is thought that NS1 organizes a replication fork and acts as the replicative 3′-to-5′ helicase. Near its C-terminus, NS1 contains a transcriptional activation domain. This domain upregulates transcription through interactions between NS1 and transcription factors, starting from a viral promoter (P38 for MVM) when NS1 is bound to a series of 5′-ACCA-3′ motifs, called the tar sequence, that are positioned upstream (toward the 5′ end) of the P38 transcription unit. NS1 also recruits the cellular replication protein A complex, which is necessary to establish the new replication fork and to bind and stabilize displaced ssDNA. NS1 is the only non-structural protein essential for replication in all cells, but other individual proteins that are essential in certain cells, such as rodent cells. For MVM, a rodent virus, NS2 appears to reprogram the host cell for efficient DNA amplification, synthesis of ssDNA progeny, capsid assembly, and virion export, though there is no evidence that NS2 is directly involved in these processes. NS2 accumulates up to three times more quickly than NS1 in the early S-phase but becomes less common as the infectious cycle progresses and P38-driven transcription becomes more prominent. Another example is the nuclear phosphoprotein NP1 of bocaviruses, which has to be properly synthesized for viable progeny genomes to be produced.

As viral NS proteins accumulate, they take control of host cell replication machinery, terminating host cell DNA synthesis and beginning viral DNA amplification. Interference with host DNA replication may be due to direct effects on host replication proteins that are not essential for viral replication, by extensive nicking of host DNA, or by restructuring the nucleus during viral infection. Early in infection, parvoviruses establish replication centers in the nucleus called autonomous parvovirus-associated replication (APAR) bodies. NS1 co-localizes with replicating viral DNA in these structures with other cellular proteins necessary for viral DNA synthesis, while other complexes not required for replication are sequestered from APAR bodies. Which proteins are included in APAR bodies is unclear and appears to vary from species to species and between cell types. As infection progresses, APAR microdomains merge with other nuclear bodies to form larger nuclear inclusions where viral replication and virion assembly occur. After S-phase begins, the host cell is forced to synthesize viral DNA and cannot leave S-phase, effectively becoming a virus factory until cell death releases progeny virions from the cell.

== MVM right-end origin ==
The right-end hairpin of MVM is 248 nucleotides in length and organized into a cruciform shape. This region is almost perfectly basepaired, with three unpaired bases at the "axis" (the "head" of the cruciform) and a mismatched region 20 nucleotides from the axis at the "right" end of the cruciform. There, a three nucleotide insertion, AGA or TCT, on one strand separates opposing pairs of NS1 binding sites, which creates a 36 basepair-length palindrome that can assume an alternate cruciform configuration. This configuration is expected to destabilize the duplex, which facilitates its ability to function as a hinge during replication. The mismatch of the unpaired bases, rather than the three-nucleotide sequence itself, may help to promote the instability of the duplex.

The complete duplex linear forms of the right-end hairpin sequence double as NS1-dependent origins. For many parvoviral telomeres, however, only an initiator binding site next to a nick site is required for there to be a functional origin. That way, less than 40 base pairs are required for nicking. For MVM, the right-end origin is a minimum of around 125 base pairs. Three recognition elements in the origin are involved, including the nick site 5′-CTWWTCA-3′ (element 1), which is seven nucleotides upstream from a duplex NS1-binding site (element 2) that is oriented to position the attached NS1 complex over the nick site. The third element is another NS1-binding site adjacent to the hairpin's axis that is more than 120 base pairs away from the nick site but still required for NS1-mediated cleavage because it stabilizes interactions between NS1 and DNA.

In vivo, the position of the nick varies by one nucleotide, with one position preferred. During nicking, the preferred site is likely exposed as a single strand and possibly stabilized as a stem-loop by the inverted repeats to the sides of the site. Optimal forms of the NS1-binding site contain at least three tandem copies of the 5′-ACCA-3′ sequence. Modest alterations to these sequences have little effect on NS1's ability to bind to them, indicating that different molecules in the NS1 complex recognize the different 5′-ACCA-3′ motifs. Consequently, the NS1-binding site that positions NS1 over the nick site in the right-end origin is considered a high affinity site despite having the suboptimal sequence 5′-(ACCA)(ACTG)A(ACCA)-3′.

With ATP, NS1 binds asymmetrically over the aforementioned sequence, protecting a region 41–43 base pairs in length from being degraded by a deoxyribonuclease enzyme (digestion). NS1 extends five nucleotides beyond the 3′ end of the ACCA repeat and about 22 nucleotides beyond the 5′ end so that its footprint ends 15 nucleotides beyond the nick site in a position to nick the origin. Nicking only occurs if the second NS1-binding site is also present in the origin and the entire complex is activated by adding an HMGB family protein such as HMG1. When HMG1 joins the complex, it binds to NS1 and mediates interactions between NS1 complexes bound to the two recognition elements in the origin. If NS1 is not present, then HMG1 binds to the hairpin sequence independently, which causes it to bend without protecting the DNA from digestion.

Cleavage is dependent on the correct spacing of the elements in the origin. Additions and deletions of more than one nucleobase are lethal, but substitutions are not. The addition of HMG1 slightly shifts which nucleotides are protected by NS1 and changes the conformation of the DNA between NS1 and HMG1. This region folds into a double-helical loop about 30 base pairs in length in a guanine-rich region of the hairpin stem. Between this element and the nick site there are five thymidine residues included in the loop. The site also has a region to its side that contains many alternating adenine and thymine residues, which likely increases flexibility. The creation of the loop allows the terminus to form into a three-dimensional structure required for nicking. Origins that fail to reconfigure into this double-helical loop with NS1 and HMG1 are not nicked.

== Terminal resolution and linear replication ==
=== Minute virus of mice ===
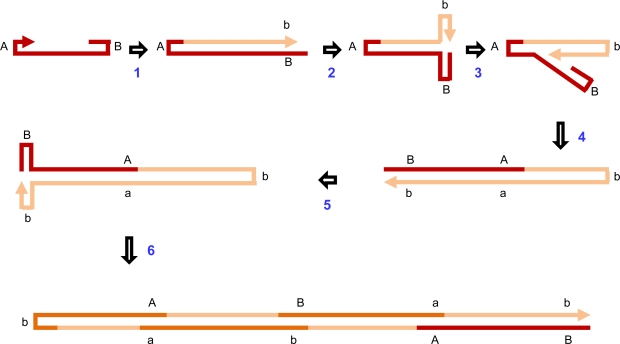
MVM rolling hairpin replication

After NS1 nicks the origin, a replication fork is established at the newly exposed 3′ nucleotide to unfold and copy the right-end hairpin. The end result is a duplex extended-form terminus that contains two copies of the palindrome. This process is usually called terminal resolution but also hairpin transfer and hairpin resolution. Terminal resolution occurs with each round of replication, so progeny genomes contain an equal number of each terminal orientation. The two orientations are termed "flip" and "flop", and may be represented as L and l, or A and a, for the flip and flop of the left-end palindromic sequence and R and r, or B and b, for the flip and flop of the right-end palindromic sequence. Because parvoviral hairpin sequences are palindromic, the flip sequence is the inverted complement of the flop sequence and vice versa.

After replication of the right end, the extended-form duplex termini are melted out, which causes the two individual strands to fold back on themselves to create hairpinned "rabbit ear" structures that have the flip and flop of the terminus. Refolding is mediated by NS1 and requires ATP hydrolysis, so NS1's helicase activity and site-specific binding activity are necessary. Rabbit ear formation enables the 3′ nucleotide of the newly synthesized DNA strand to pair with an internal base, which repositions the replication fork to switch template strands and prime synthesis of the next linear sequence. After the replication fork is repositioned, replication continues toward the left end, which displaces the original negative-sense strand and replaces it with a new covalently continuous strand.

During fork progression, the turnaround form of the left hairpin is unfolded, copied, and refolded. (Note: The turnaround form of a terminus refers to the covalently continuous sequences that join two strands at the ends of replicative molecules.) NS1 is probably required to unfold the left-end hairpin. It appears to be involved in melting out and reconfiguring the resulting extended-form left-end duplex into rabbit ears, albeit less efficiently than at the right end. For MVM, concatemers containing multiple copies of the genome are replicated successively, with coding sequences synthesized twice as often as the termini. In these concatemers, alternating unit-length genomes are fused through palindromic junctions in left-end-to-left-end and right-end-to-right-end orientations. Both the linear and hairpin configurations of the right-end telomere support initiation of RHR, so resolution of duplex right-end-to-right-end junctions can occur on the basepaired duplex junction sequence or after this complex is formed into rabbit ears. It is unclear which is more common since both appear to produce identical results.

=== Adeno-associated virus ===
For AAV, terminal palindromes, which are 125 nucleotides long, are able to fold into T-shaped hairpins. Three elements are required to resolve this structure: a 22-base initiator-binding site in the stem region of the termini, called Rep-binding element (RBE), that has five slightly degenerate tandem repeats of the initiator-binding motif 5′-GAGC-3′ that locates the nuclease at the correct position and orientation for nicking DNA; a nicking or terminal resolution site (trs) in the upper strand 16 nucleotides inboard of the RBE and flanked by short palindromic repeats that can form into a stem-loop to present trs as ssDNA; and the sequence 5′-GTTTC-3′ at the tip of the hairpin arm opposite the nick site. All three elements make contact with the nicking complex.

AAV contains a rep gene that encodes four Rep proteins, two of which, Rep68 and Rep78, are replication initiator proteins. During terminal resolution, Rep68/78 nicks trs with a transesterification reaction that transfers the DNA's phosphodiester bond to a tyrosine hydroxyl in the active site nuclease, which leaves the nuclease covalently attached to the 5′ nucleotide and liberates a basepaired 3′-OH to prime a new fork. This fork moves along the hairpin stem toward its axis and copies the lower strand while displacing the top strand. The terminal palindrome is sequentially unfolded and copied in the form of its inverted complemented. This inversion occurs every time a turnaround form of the telomere is replicated, which creates an equal number of flip and flop termini. Because both AAV termini can be nicked in the hairpin configuration, both termini have equal numbers of flip and flop orientations. (Note: AAV replication is dependent on a helper virus, either an adenovirus or a herpesvirus, that coinfects the cell. If coinfection does not occur, then the AAV genome is integrated into the host cell's DNA until coinfection occurs.)

== MVM left-end origin ==
In negative-sense MVM genomes, the left-end hairpin is 121 nucleotides in length and in a flip sequence orientation. This telomere is Y-shaped and contains small internal palindromes that fold into the "ears" of the Y, as well as a duplex stem region 43 base pairs in length that is interrupted by an asymmetric thymidine residue and a mismatched "bubble" sequence in which 5′-GAA-3′ on the inboard strand is opposite 5′-GA-3′ in the outboard strand. The bubble's GA sequence is relatively unimportant, but the space that it occupies is necessary for the origin to function. When the left end is in a hairpin configuration, the bubble sequence prevents assembly of a nicking complex. The left end can, however, be resolved when the hairpin is unfolded and copied to create a dimer junction, which is a duplex copy of the left-end hairpin that links two copies of the coding portion of the genome in RF molecules.

The left-end telomere of MVM, and likely of all heterotelomeric parvoviruses, cannot function as an origin when as a hairpin. Instead, a single origin is created when the hairpin is unfolded and copied to form a basepaired palindromic junction sequence. Within this structure, the sequence from the outboard arm that surrounds the GA bubble sequence acts as an origin, OriL_{TC}. The equivalent sequence on the inboard arm of the bubble sequence, called OriL_{GAA}, does not serve as an origin. The inboard arm and hairpin of the terminus instead are likely upstream control elements for the viral transcriptional promoter P4. The left-end telomere of MVM can switch between this extended duplex form with a few asymmetries and a cruciform structure that has a 36 base pair palindrome, with repeats of the NS1-binding motif 5′-TGGT-3′, that folds into two arms.

The minimal linear left-end origin is about 50 base pairs long and extends from two 5′-ACGT-3′ motifs, spaced five nucleotides apart, to about seven base pairs beyond the nick site. Within the origin, there are three recognition sequences: the two ACGT motifs and an NS1-binding site that orients the NS1 complex over the nick site 5′-CTWWTCA-3′, which is located 17 nucleotides downstream (toward the 3′ end) from the NS1-binding site. These motifs bind a cellular factor called either parvovirus initiation factor (PIF) or glucocorticoid modulating element-binding protein. PIF is a site-specific DNA-binding complex that contains two subunits, p79 and p96, and acts as a transcription modulator in infected cells. It binds DNA by a KDWK fold and recognizes two ACGT half-sites. PIF stabilizes the binding of NS1 on the active form of the left-end origin, OriL_{TC}, but not on the inactive form, OriL_{GAA}, because the two complexes can come in contact with each other over the bubble.

== Asymmetric junction resolution ==
For heterotelomeric viruses, such as MVM, left-end termini in the turnaround configuration cannot be nicked, and terminal resolution only occurs at the right end. Due to the location of OriL_{TC} in the dimer junction, creating new copies of the left-end hairpin in the flip orientation is not straightforward since a replication fork moving from the origin should synthesize DNA in the flop orientation. Instead, the left-hand MVM dimer junction is resolved asymmetrically in a process that creates a cruciform intermediate and melts and reorients both arms of the duplex. Two telomeres are created: one derived from the inboard, GAA arm of the hairpin in the extended configuration and the other from the outboard, TC arm into a turnaround configuration. Construction of the cruciform accomplishes two things: it enables synthesis of DNA in the correct (flip) orientation at the left end of all full-length genomes, and it creates a structure that can be resolved by NS1. Resolution is likely driven by NS1's helicase activity and depends on the duplex palindrome's instability, which allows it to switch between linear and cruciform configurations.

NS1 initially nicks OriL_{TC} in the B ("right") arm of the junction and covalently bonds to the DNA on the 5′ side of the nick, exposing a basepaired 3′ nucleotide. Depending on how fast a replication fork is assembled, two outcomes can then occur. If assembly is rapid, then "read-through" synthesis copies the upper strand while the junction is in its linear configuration, which regenerates the duplex junction and displaces a positive-sense strand that is recycled for replication. This promotes duplex DNA amplification but does not lead to synthesis of termini in the correction orientation or to junction resolution. To create a resolvable structure, nicking must be followed by melting and rearrangement of the junction into a cruciform. Once the cruciform extends to beyond the nick site, the exposed primer at the nick site in OriL_{TC} switches templates by annealing with its complement in the lower arm of the cruciform. If a replication fork is then assembled, then the lower arm is subsequently unfolded and copied. This creates a heterocruciform intermediate with the newly synthesized telomere in the flip orientation attached to the lower strand of the B arm. This modified junction is called MJ2 and consists of an A ("left") arm, B ("right") arm, an "upper" arm with rabbit ears, and a "lower" arm with rabbit ears.

The lower arm of MJ2 is an extended-form palindrome identical to those made during terminal resolution. Once the lower arm is synthesized, it is susceptible to rabbit-ear formation, which repositions the 3′ end of the lower arm so that it pairs with the inboard sequences on the junction's B arm to prime strand displacement synthesis to create an intermediate junction called MJ1 and gradually displace the upper strand. This leads to the release of a newly synthesized B turn-around (B-ta) sequence. The remaining molecule, called δJ, contains an intact upper strand of the junction paired to the lower strand of the A ("left") arm, which has an NS1 complex attached at the 5′ end of a copy of the left-end hairpin. The next step is not clear but can be inferred based on what is known about the process up to this point. NS1's helicase is expected to create a structure in which the nick site in δJ's A arm, which is usually inactive, is temporarily and repeatedly exposed in a single-stranded form, which allows NS1 to engage the OriL_{GAA} nick site without a cofactor. Nicking releases a positive-sense B strand from δJ and leaves a basepaired 3′ nucleotide on the A arm of δJ to prime DNA synthesis. If a replication fork is established here, then the A strand is unfolded and copied to create its duplex extended form.

In vivo, the aforementioned nick may not occur because the ends of the dimer replicative form have efficient right-end origins. Consequently, replication forks may progress back toward the dimer junction from the genome's right end, copying the B arm's top strand before the final resolution nick. This bypasses dimer bridge resolution and recycles the top strand into a pool of replicating duplex dimers. For LuIII, a heterotelomeric parvovirus, the single-strand nick releases a positive-sense strand with its left-end hairpin in the flop orientation. Unlike MVM, LuIII packages both sense strands with equal frequency due to a 2-base insertion in the right-end origin that slows initiation. In the negative-sense strands, left-end hairpins are all in the flip orientation, while in positive-sense strands, there are an equal number of flips and flops. When the 2-base insertion is removed, nicking efficiency returns to normal and LuIII mainly encapsidates negative-sense genomes. Packaging of a particular 3′ terminus is therefore not driven by a specific packaging signal. (Note: LuIII is the main parvovirus that has been used to study parvovirus packaging.)

== Synthesis of progeny ==
Individual progeny genomes are excised from replicative concatemers by nicking origins, which establishes replication forks that replicate the telomeres and displace monomeric ssDNA genomes from the replicative molecule through terminal resolution and junction resolution. The excision of individual genomes ensures that each progeny capsid gets one progeny genome. The extended-form termini created during the excision process are the same as the extended-form molecules during terminal resolution, so they can be melted out and refolded into rabbit ears for additional rounds of replication. Consequently, numerous replicative concatemers are created in infected cells.

Displacement of progeny ssDNA genomes occurs predominately or exclusively during active DNA replication or when there are preassembled empty capsids in the cell. Displacement of single strands may therefore be associated with packaging viral DNA into capsids. Earlier research suggested that the preassembled viral particle may sequester the genome in a 5′-to-3′ direction as it is displaced from the replication fork, but more recent research suggests that packaging is in a 3′-to-5′ direction, driven by the viral helicase using newly synthesized single strands. This helicase activity acts as a motor that attaches to the capsid and uses ATP hydrolysis to translocate the genome into the capsid in a 3′-to-5′ direction. Progeny genomes are inserted into preassembled, empty capsids through a cylindrical entrance, called a portal, at one of the icosahedral five-fold axes of the capsid, which may be opposite the opening from when genomes are expelled early in the replication cycle. This leaves its 5′ end in the portal, connected to the 5′-associated NS1 molecule by the tether sequence at the virion surface.

The Kinetic Hairpin Transfer (KHT) model may predict which strands are selected for encapsidation. It postulates that the relative efficiency of resolving and replicating genomic termini determines the distribution of amplified replication intermediates during infection and how efficient single strands of a particular sense and terminal orientation are excised. Consequently, some parvoviruses preferentially excise and encapsidate negative-sense genomes, some positive- and negative-sense at equal proportions, and some both sense strands at different proportions. Homotelomeric parvoviruses typically displace and package strands of both polarity with a 50:50 mix of flip and flop orientations of each telomere, because their genomes are nicked and displaced by the same mechanism with the same efficiency, while heterotelomeric parvoviruses tend to displace and package primarily negative-sense strands because their termini are processed differently, with more efficient nicking and rabbit ear formation at the right-end. Their right-end hairpins have an even number of flips and flops, because they use terminal resolution, but the left end is usually in the flip orientation due to junction resolution. The relative frequency of packaged sense strands and flips and flops of termini in packaged DNA can therefore be used to infer which resolution method was used during excision.

Among parvoviruses that package strands of one sense, replication appears to occur in two phases. At earlier times, both sense strands are excised. Replication then switches to enable exclusive synthesis of a single sense for packaging. A modified form of the KHT model, called the preferential strand displacement model, proposes that the switch in replication is due to the onset of packaging and that the packaging substrate is a newly displaced ssDNA molecule.

== Comparison to rolling circle replication ==
Many small replicons that have circular genomes, such as many ssDNA viruses and plasmids, replicate by rolling circle replication (RCR), which is a unidirectional, strand displacement form of DNA replication. RHR is similar to RCR and can be considered a variation or adaptation of it used for linear genomes. In RCR, successive rounds of replication proceed in a loop around the genome and are initiated and terminated by site-specific single-strand nicks made by a replicon-encoded encoded endonuclease, variously called the nickase, relaxase, mobilization protein (mob), transesterase, or replication protein (Rep). The replication initiator protein of parvoviruses is genetically related to these other endonucleases. They contain three motifs important for replication, two of which are retained within parvovirus initiator proteins: an HUHUUU cluster, thought to bind to a Mg^{2+} ion required for nicking, and a YxxxK motif that contains the active-site tyrosine that attacks the phosphodiester bond of target DNA.

The strategies used in parvovirus RHR to engage the nick site are also present in RCR. Most RCR origins are in the form of duplex DNA that has to be melted before nicking. RCR initiator proteins do this by binding to specific duplex DNA-binding sequences in the origin next to the initiation site. The latter site is then melted in a process that consumes ATP and which is assisted by the separated strands reconfiguring into stem-loop structures. In these structures, the nick site is on an exposed loop. Many RCR initiator proteins contain helicase activity, which lets them melt DNA prior to nicking and serve as the 3′-to-5′ helicase in the replication fork, a trait also possessed by parvovirus initiator proteins. Parvoviral initiator proteins retain the transesterification activity used by RCR initiator proteins, but they have lost the ability to ligate DNA strands into circular molecules because they remain attached to the 5′ end of potential progeny genomes after nicking, where they remain during replication, packaging, and virion release. Lastly, palindromic elements that can alternate between intra- and inter-strand basepairing are in many RCR origins, but in parvoviruses these are duplicated and expanded into termini that fold and unfold during replication (hairpins).
