= Aveparvovirus =

Virus classification
- (unranked): Virus
- Realm: Monodnaviria
- Kingdom: Shotokuvirae
- Phylum: Cossaviricota
- Class: Quintoviricetes
- Order: Piccovirales
- Family: Parvoviridae
- Subfamily: Parvovirinae
- Genus: Aveparvovirus

Genus of viruses

Aveparvovirus is a genus of viruses, in the subfamily Parvovirinae of the virus family Parvoviridae. There are 11 species in this genus. Diseases associated with this genus include: enteric disease and malabsorption syndrome.

== Taxonomy ==
The genus contains the following species, listed by scientific name and followed by the exemplar virus of the species:

- Aveparvovirus anseriform1, Mute swan feces associated aveparvovirus
- Aveparvovirus avian1, Bird parvovirus strain Bir-01-1
- Aveparvovirus columbid1, Pigeon parvovirus 1
- Aveparvovirus galliform1, Turkey parvovirus
- Aveparvovirus galliform2, Parvovirus gps215par1
- Aveparvovirus gruiform1, Red-crowned crane parvovirus
- Aveparvovirus passeriform1, Pileated finch aveparvovirus
- Aveparvovirus passeriform2, Aveparvovirus bfb009ave01
- Aveparvovirus passeriform3, Parvoviridae sp. isolate wwb174par01
- Aveparvovirus psittacine1, Ara ararauna aveparvovirus
- Aveparvovirus psittacine2, Parvovirus par081par1

== Structure ==
Viruses in Aveparvovirus are non-enveloped, with icosahedral and round geometries, and T=1 symmetry. The diameter is around 18-26 nm. Genomes are linear, around 6kb in length.

Genus	Structure	Symmetry	Capsid	Genomic arrangement	Genomic segmentation
Aveparvovirus	Icosahedral	T=1	Non-enveloped	Linear	None

== Life cycle ==
Viral replication is nuclear. Entry into the host cell is achieved by attachment to host receptors, and is probably driven by clathrin-mediated endocytosis. Replication follows the rolling-hairpin model. DNA-templated transcription, with some alternative splicing mechanism is the method of transcription. Its cell exit strategy remains to be determined but probably involves cell lysis, as seen for other parvoviruses,. Birds serve as the natural host.

Genus	Host details	Tissue tropism	Entry details	Release details	Replication site	Assembly site	Transmission
Aveparvovirus	Birds	uncertain	Clathrin-mediated endocytosis	uncertain	Nucleus	Nucleus	Aerosol; oral-fecal
