= Shripenbrevirus =

Virus classification
- Missing taxonomy template (fix): Shripenbrevirus

Genus of viruses

Shripenbrevirus is a genus of viruses in the subfamily Penbrevirinae of the virus family Parvoviridae. Shrimp and insects serve as natural hosts. There is only one species in this genus: Infectious hypodermal and hematopoietic necrosis virus, also called Penaeus stylirostris penstyldensovirus 1 (Shripenbrevirus decapod1).

== Structure ==
Viruses in Shripenbrevirus are non-enveloped, with icosahedral and round geometries, and T=1 symmetry. The diameter is around 21-22 nm. Genomes are linear, around 4kb in length.

Genus	Structure	Symmetry	Capsid	Genomic arrangement	Genomic segmentation
Shripenbrevirus	Icosahedral	T=1	Non-enveloped	Linear	Segmented

== Life cycle ==
Viral replication is nuclear. Entry into the host cell is achieved by attachment to host receptors, which mediates clathrin-mediated endocytosis. Replication follows the rolling-hairpin model. DNA-templated transcription, with some alternative splicing mechanism is the method of transcription. The virus exits the host cell by nuclear pore export. Shrimps and insects serve as the natural host.

Genus	Host details	Tissue tropism	Entry details	Release details	Replication site	Assembly site	Transmission
Shripenbrevirus	Crustaceans	None	Clathrin-mediated endocytosis	Budding	Nucleus	Nucleus	Unknown
