= Brevipenbrevirus =

Virus classification
- Missing taxonomy template (fix): Brevipenbrevirus

Genus of viruses

Brevipenbrevirus is a genus of viruses in subfamily Penbrevirinae of the family Parvoviridae. Mosquitoes serve as natural hosts. There are four species in this genus.

== Taxonomy ==
The genus contains the following species, listed by scientific name and followed by the exemplar virus of the species:

- Brevipenbrevirus dipteran1, Anopheles gambiae densovirus
- Brevipenbrevirus dipteran2, Aedes albopictus densovirus 2
- Brevipenbrevirus orthopteran1, Acheta domesticus segmented densovirus
- Brevipenbrevirus orthopteran2, Soybean thrips denso-like virus 1

== Structure ==
Viruses in genus Brevipenbrevirus are non-enveloped and have T=1 icosahedral symmetry. The diameter is around 21-22 nm. Genomes are linear, around 4kb in length.

Genus	Structure	Symmetry	Capsid	Genomic arrangement	Genomic segmentation
Brevipenbrevirus	Icosahedral	T=1	Non-enveloped	Linear	None

== Life cycle ==
Viral replication is nuclear. Entry into the host cell is achieved by attachment to host receptors, which mediates clathrin-mediated endocytosis. Replication follows the rolling-hairpin model. DNA-templated transcription, with some alternative splicing mechanism is the method of transcription. Mosquitoes serve as the natural host.

Genus	Host details	Tissue tropism	Entry details	Release details	Replication site	Assembly site	Transmission
Brevipenbrevirus	Insects: diptera	None	Clathrin-mediated endocytosis	Cell lysis	Nucleus	Nucleus	Unknown
