= Copiparvovirus =

Virus classification
- (unranked): Virus
- Realm: Floreoviria
- Kingdom: Shotokuvirae
- Phylum: Cossaviricota
- Class: Quintoviricetes
- Order: Piccovirales
- Family: Parvoviridae
- Subfamily: Parvovirinae
- Genus: Copiparvovirus

Genus of viruses

Copiparvovirus is a genus of viruses in subfamily Parvovirinae of the virus family Parvoviridae. There are 10 species in this genus.

== Taxonomy ==
The genus contains the following species, listed by scientific name and followed by the exemplar virus of the species:

- Copiparvovirus pinniped1, Sesavirus
- Copiparvovirus ungulate1, Bovine parvovirus 2
- Copiparvovirus ungulate2, Porcine parvovirus 4
- Copiparvovirus ungulate3, Roe deer copiparvovirus
- Copiparvovirus ungulate4, Porcine parvovirus 6
- Copiparvovirus ungulate5, Bosavirus
- Copiparvovirus ungulate6, Equine parvovirus-hepatitis
- Copiparvovirus ungulate7, Eqcopivirus
- Copiparvovirus ungulate8, Horse parvovirus CSF
- Copiparvovirus ungulate9, Sika deer copiparvovirus

== Structure ==
Viruses in genus Copiparvovirus are non-enveloped, with icosahedral and round geometries, and T=1 symmetry. The diameter is around 18-26 nm. Genomes are linear, around 6kb in length.

Genus	Structure	Symmetry	Capsid	Genomic arrangement	Genomic segmentation
Copiparvovirus	Icosahedral	T=1	Non-enveloped	Linear	None

== Life cycle ==
Viral replication is nuclear. Entry into the host cell is achieved by attachment to host receptors, which mediates clathrin-mediated endocytosis. Replication follows the rolling-hairpin model. DNA-templated transcription, with some alternative splicing mechanism is the method of transcription. The virus exits the host cell by nuclear pore export.

Genus	Host details	Tissue tropism	Entry details	Release details	Replication site	Assembly site	Transmission
Copiparvovirus	Ungulates	Not defined	Clathrin-mediated endocytosis	Lysis	Nucleus	Nucleus	Unknown
