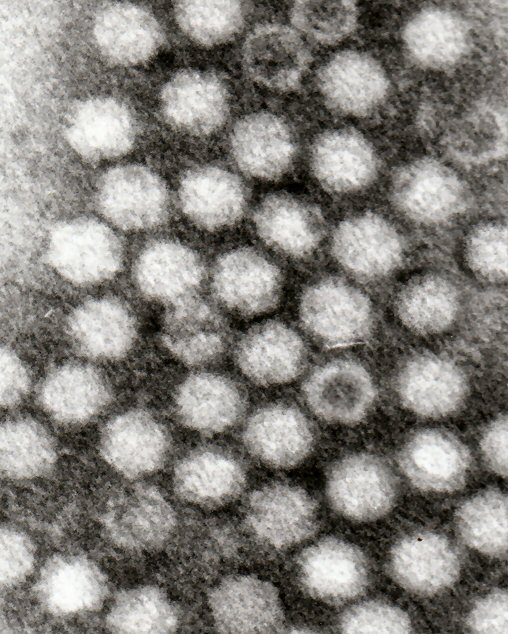

Virus classification
- (unranked): Virus
- Realm: Floreoviria
- Kingdom: Shotokuvirae
- Phylum: Cossaviricota
- Class: Quintoviricetes
- Order: Piccovirales
- Family: Parvoviridae
- Subfamily: Parvovirinae
- Genus: Dependoparvovirus

Species
- See text

= Dependoparvovirus =

Genus of viruses

Dependoparvovirus (formerly Dependovirus or Adeno-associated virus group) is a genus in the subfamily Parvovirinae of the virus family Parvoviridae; they are Group II viruses according to the Baltimore classification.

The name refers to the fact that all dependoviruses, except duck parvovirus and goose parvovirus, cannot replicate productively in their host cell without the cell being coinfected by a helper virus such as an adenovirus, a herpesvirus, or a vaccinia virus.

== Species ==
The genus contains the following species, listed by scientific name and followed by the exemplar virus of the species:

- Dependoparvovirus anseriform1, Muscovy duck parvovirus, also called Barbarie duck parvovirus
- Dependoparvovirus anseriform2, Anser anser dependoparvovirus
- Dependoparvovirus anseriform3, Dependoparvovirus zftwig01adas1
- Dependoparvovirus anseriform4, Adeno-associated_virus_MHH-05-2015
- Dependoparvovirus anseriform5, Dependoparvovirus zftwig05par3
- Dependoparvovirus avian1, Avian adeno-associated virus
- Dependoparvovirus avian2, Avian adeno-associated virus BR_DF12
- Dependoparvovirus carnivoran1, Feline dependoparvovirus
- Dependoparvovirus carnivoran2, ParvoviridaeDogfe340C1
- Dependoparvovirus carnivoran3, ParvoviridaeDogfe380C5
- Dependoparvovirus carnivoran4, ParvoviridaeDogfe346C1
- Dependoparvovirus carnivoran5, ParvoviridaeDogfe385C1
- Dependoparvovirus carnivoran6, ParvoviridaeDogfe383C2
- Dependoparvovirus chiropteran1, Bat adeno-associated virus
- Dependoparvovirus chiropteran2, Desmodus rotundus dependoparvovirus
- Dependoparvovirus mammalian1, Adeno-associated virus 5
- Dependoparvovirus passeriform1, Dependoparvovirus swa134par4
- Dependoparvovirus passeriform2, Dependoparvovirus plw155par1
- Dependoparvovirus pinniped1, California sea lion adeno-associated virus 1
- Dependoparvovirus primate1, Adeno-associated virus 2
- Dependoparvovirus psittacine1, Psittacidae dependoparvovirus
- Dependoparvovirus rodent1, Murine adeno-associated virus 1
- Dependoparvovirus rodent2, Murine adeno-associated virus 2
- Dependoparvovirus rodent3, Myodes glareolus adeno-associated virus 1
- Dependoparvovirus rodent4, Myodes glareolus adeno-associated virus 2
- Dependoparvovirus squamate1, Snake adeno-associated virus
- Dependoparvovirus squamate2, Bearded dragon parvovirus

== Virology ==
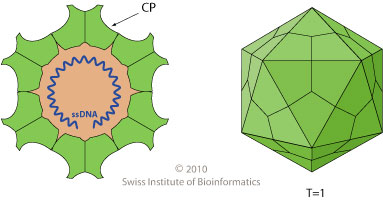
Schematic drawing of a virus particle of Dependoparvovirus (cross section and side view)

Dependoparvoviruses have an icosahedral shape, measure 22 nm and are composed of 60 wedge-shaped proteins (triangulation number = 1). Three proteins (VP1, VP2 and VP3) are present in each capsomere. Each capsid is made from 5 VP1, 5 VP2, and 50 VP3 proteins. The capsid does not have an envelope.

The genome is a single molecule of single stranded DNA with a length of 4.7 kilobases. It has only two open reading frames. The 3' open reading frame is the structural capsid protein, cap, which can be spliced to form two RNAs, one for virion protein 1 (VP1) and the other goes on to eventually make VP2 and VP3. The second gene, rep, can be spliced into four different, nonstructural, regulatory proteins that all aid in the genome replication. These proteins are named Rep 78, Rep68, Rep 52, and Rep 40 based on their molecular weight.

Due to inverted terminal repeats (ITRs) at each end of the genome, a T-shaped secondary structure is formed. The complementary areas leave a 3' hydroxyl group single stranded for the replication to begin. This 3' hydroxyl group is used as a primer for the leading strand synthesis. Both positive and negative sense strands of DNA are made. Double stranded intermediates are formed throughout the replication; this means the two strands, positive and negative sense, will be matched up.

== Host range ==
These viruses are capable of replication within all vertebrates. They are only limited by the virus they must infect with, also known as the helper virus. These helper viruses are necessary for the replication of a dependoparvovirus. Helper viruses include adenoviruses and herpesviruses.
