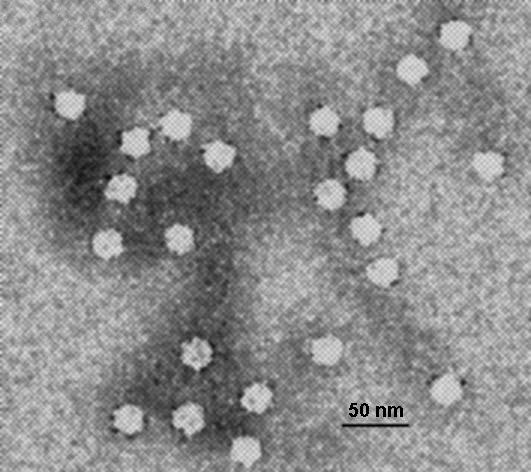
- Electron micrograph of canine parvovirus

Virus classification
- (unranked): Virus
- Realm: Monodnaviria
- Kingdom: Shotokuvirae
- Phylum: Cossaviricota
- Class: Quintoviricetes
- Order: Piccovirales
- Family: Parvoviridae
- Subfamily: Parvovirinae

= Parvovirinae =

Subfamily of viruses

Parvovirinae is a subfamily of viruses in the family Parvoviridae. There are 11 genera assigned to this subfamily.

== Taxonomy ==
The following 11 genera are recognized:

- Amdoparvovirus
- Artiparvovirus
- Aveparvovirus
- Bocaparvovirus
- Copiparvovirus
- Dependoparvovirus
- Erythroparvovirus
- Loriparvovirus
- Protoparvovirus
- Sandeparvovirus
- Tetraparvovirus
