= Protohepanvirus =

Virus classification
- Missing taxonomy template (fix): Protohepanvirus

Genus of viruses

Protohepanvirus is a genus of viruses that belongs to the Hepanvirinae subfamily of the family Parvoviridae. Insects and shrimps serve as natural hosts. Infection leads to mortality in the early larval and postlarval stages of the shrimp. There is only one species in this genus: Fenneropenaeus chinensis hepatopancreatic densovirus (Protohepanvirus decapod1).

== Structure ==
Viruses in genus Protohepanvirus are non-enveloped, with T=1 icosahedral symmetry and round geometries. The diameter is around 21-22 nm. Genomes are linear, around 6kb in length.

Genus	Structure	Symmetry	Capsid	Genomic arrangement	Genomic segmentation
Protohepanvirus	Icosahedral	T=1	Non-enveloped	Linear	Segmented

== Life cycle ==
Viral replication is nuclear. Entry into the host cell is achieved by attachment to host receptors, which mediate clathrin-mediated endocytosis. Replication follows the rolling-hairpin model. DNA-templated transcription, with some alternative splicing mechanism is the method of transcription. The virus exits the host cell by nuclear pore export. Insects and shrimps serve as the natural host.

Genus	Host details	Tissue tropism	Entry details	Release details	Replication site	Assembly site	Transmission
Protohepanvirus	Crustaceans	None	Clathrin-mediated endocytosis	Budding	Nucleus	Nucleus	Unknown
