= Iteradensovirus =

Virus classification
- (unranked): Virus
- Realm: Monodnaviria
- Kingdom: Shotokuvirae
- Phylum: Cossaviricota
- Class: Quintoviricetes
- Order: Piccovirales
- Family: Parvoviridae
- Subfamily: Densovirinae
- Genus: Iteradensovirus

Genus of viruses

Iteradensovirus is a genus of viruses in the subfamily Densovirinae of the family Parvoviridae. Insects serve as natural hosts. There are seven species in this genus.

== Taxonomy ==
The genus contains the following species, listed by scientific name and followed by the exemplar virus of the species:

- Iteradensovirus incertum1, Bat-associated densovirus 5
- Iteradensovirus incertum2, Human CSF-associated densovirus
- Iteradensovirus lepidopteran1, Bombyx mori densovirus 1
- Iteradensovirus lepidopteran2, Casphalia extranea densovirus
- Iteradensovirus lepidopteran3, Dendrolimus punctatus densovirus
- Iteradensovirus lepidopteran4, Papilio polyxenes densovirus
- Iteradensovirus lepidopteran5, Helicoverpa armigera densovirus

== Structure ==
Viruses in Iteradensovirus are non-enveloped, with icosahedral and Round geometries, and T=1 symmetry. The diameter is around 21-22 nm. Genomes are linear, around 5kb in length.

Genus	Structure	Symmetry	Capsid	Genomic arrangement	Genomic segmentation
Iteradensovirus	Icosahedral	T=1	Non-enveloped	Linear	None

== Life cycle ==
Viral replication is nuclear. Entry into the host cell is achieved by attachment to host receptors, which mediates clathrin-mediated endocytosis. Replication follows the rolling-hairpin model. DNA templated transcription, with some alternative splicing mechanism is the method of transcription. Insects serve as the natural host.

Genus	Host details	Tissue tropism	Entry details	Release details	Replication site	Assembly site	Transmission
Iteradensovirus	Insects: lepidoptera	Variable	Clathrin-mediated endocytosis	Lysis	Nucleus	Nucleus	Unknown
