= Amdoparvovirus =

Virus classification
- (unranked): Virus
- Realm: Floreoviria
- Kingdom: Shotokuvirae
- Phylum: Cossaviricota
- Class: Quintoviricetes
- Order: Piccovirales
- Family: Parvoviridae
- Subfamily: Parvovirinae
- Genus: Amdoparvovirus

Genus of viruses

Amdoparvovirus is a genus of viruses in the family Parvoviridae in the subfamily Parvovirinae. Mustelids (minks, ferrets), foxes, skunk, and raccoons serve as natural hosts. There are 11 species in this genus. Diseases associated with this genus include progressive disorder of immune system.

== Taxonomy ==
The genus contains the following species, listed by scientific name and followed by the exemplar virus of the species:

- Amdoparvovirus carnivoran1, Aleutian mink disease parvovirus
- Amdoparvovirus carnivoran2, Gray fox amdovirus
- Amdoparvovirus carnivoran3, Racoon dog and fox amdoparvovirus
- Amdoparvovirus carnivoran4, Skunk amdoparvovirus
- Amdoparvovirus carnivoran5, Red panda amdoparvovirus
- Amdoparvovirus carnivoran6, Labrador amdoparvovirus 1
- Amdoparvovirus carnivoran7, Red panda amdoparvovirus 2
- Amdoparvovirus carnivoran8, British Columbia amdoparvovirus
- Amdoparvovirus carnivoran9, Aleutian mink disease virus 2
- Amdoparvovirus carnivoran10, Aleutian mink disease virus 3
- Amdoparvovirus chiropteran1, Sabeidhel virus 1

== Structure ==
Viruses in the genus Amdoparvovirus have non-enveloped protein particles with T=1 icosahedral symmetry. They are around 18 to 26 nm in diameter and contain a single linear single-stranded DNA genome around 4.8 kb in length.

Genus	Structure	Symmetry	Capsid	Genomic arrangement	Genomic segmentation
Amdoparvovirus	Icosahedral	T=1	Non-enveloped	Linear	None

== Life cycle ==
Viral replication is nuclear. Entry into the host cell is achieved by attachment to host receptors, which mediate clathrin-mediated endocytosis. Replication follows the rolling-hairpin model. DNA templated transcription, with some alternative splicing mechanism is the method of transcription. The virus may exit the host cell by vesicular trafficking following nuclear pore export or be released following cell lysis. Mustelids, skunk, and raccoons serve as the natural host. Transmission routes are oral and respiratory.

Genus	Host details	Tissue tropism	Entry details	Release details	Replication site	Assembly site	Transmission
Amdoparvovirus	Mammals: minks, ferrets, foxes	None	Clathrin-mediated endocytosis	Vesicular export or cell lysis	Nucleus	Nucleus	Unknown
