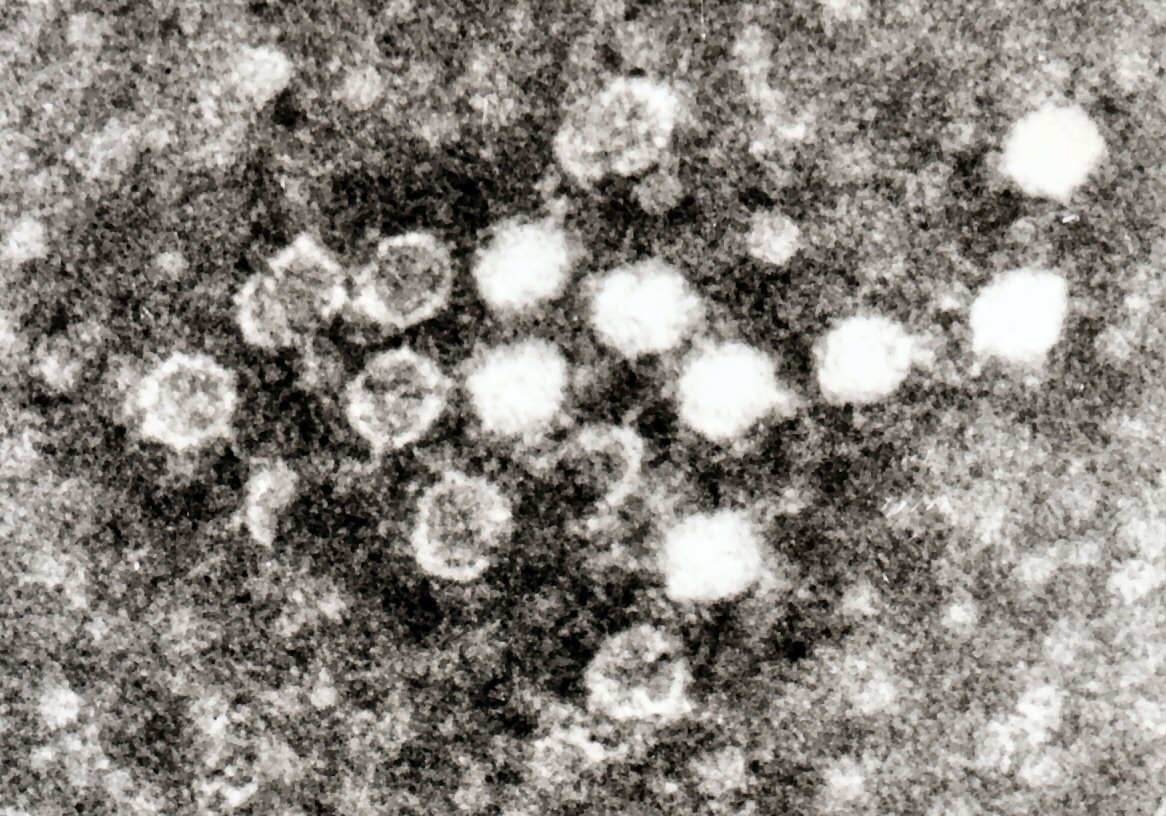

Virus classification
- (unranked): Virus
- Realm: Monodnaviria
- Kingdom: Shotokuvirae
- Phylum: Cossaviricota
- Class: Quintoviricetes
- Order: Piccovirales
- Family: Parvoviridae
- Subfamily: Parvovirinae
- Genus: Erythroparvovirus

= Erythroparvovirus =

Genus of viruses

Erythroparvovirus is a genus of viruses in subfamily Parvovirinae of the virus family Parvoviridae. There are seven species in this genus. Diseases associated with this genus include fifth disease and skin lesions.

== Taxonomy ==
The genus contains the following species, listed by scientific name and followed by the exemplar virus of the species:

- Erythroparvovirus pinniped1, Seal parvovirus
- Erythroparvovirus primate1, Human parvovirus B19
- Erythroparvovirus primate2, Simian parvovirus
- Erythroparvovirus primate3, Rhesus macaque parvovirus
- Erythroparvovirus primate4, Pig-tailed macaque parvovirus
- Erythroparvovirus rodent1, Chipmunk parvovirus
- Erythroparvovirus ungulate1, Bovine parvovirus 3

== Structure ==
Viruses in Erythroparvovirus are non-enveloped, with icosahedral and round geometries, and T=1 symmetry. The diameter is around 18-26 nm. Genomes are linear, around 6kb in length.

Genus	Structure	Symmetry	Capsid	Genomic arrangement	Genomic segmentation
Erythroparvovirus	Icosahedral	T=1	Non-enveloped	Linear	None

== Life cycle ==
Viral replication is nuclear. Entry into the host cell is achieved by attachment to host receptors, which mediates clathrin-mediated endocytosis. Replication follows the rolling-hairpin model. DNA-templated transcription, with some alternative splicing mechanism is the method of transcription. The virus exits the host cell by nuclear pore export. Transmission routes are oral and respiratory.

Genus	Host details	Tissue tropism	Entry details	Release details	Replication site	Assembly site	Transmission
Erythroparvovirus	Vertebrates	often restricted to erythroid progenitors	Clathrin-mediated endocytosis	Cell lysis	Nucleus	Nucleus	Aerosol
