= Densovirinae =

Virus classification
- (unranked): Virus
- Realm: Floreoviria
- Kingdom: Shotokuvirae
- Phylum: Cossaviricota
- Class: Quintoviricetes
- Order: Piccovirales
- Family: Parvoviridae
- Subfamily: Densovirinae

Genera
- See text

Subfamily of viruses

Densovirinae is a subfamily of single-stranded DNA viruses in the family Parvoviridae. The subfamily has 11 recognized genera. Densoviruses are known to infect members of insect orders Blattodea, Diptera, Hemiptera, Hymenoptera, Lepidoptera, and Orthoptera, while some viruses infect and multiply in crustaceans such as shrimp or crayfish, or sea stars from phylum Echinodermata.

== Virology ==
Densoviruses are small (18–26 nanometers in diameter) and non enveloped. Virions are icosahedral in shape with triangulation number (T) = 1. There are 60 copies of the coat protein in the virion. Each copy has a shape described as a "quadrilateral 'kite-shaped' wedge", and the appearance of the surface is rough with many small projections. Virions do not appear to contain lipids.

Genomes are non-segmented, about 4–6 kilobases in length and usually contain two or three open reading frames. The 5' open reading frame encodes two nonstructural proteins (NS-1 and NS-2) and the 3' open reading frame encodes two or three capsid proteins (VP1, VP2, VP3). Both the 5' and 3' termini have hairpin loops. If a third open reading frame is present (depends on the genus) it encodes a second non structural protein. The genome is ambisense, encoding proteins on both the positive sense and negative sense directions. Transcriptional regulation and post-transcriptional modification are used to produce different nonstructural proteins and structural proteins.

Virion cell entry is achieved by attachment to host receptors, which may be mediated by clathrin-mediated endocytosis or clathrin-independent dynamin-dependent endocytosis. The NS-1 protein has a superfamily 3 DNA helicase and an HuH endonuclease motif. These motifs are common in small DNA viruses. The proteins that contain these motifs bind to the viral origins of replication and unwind and nick these origins, allowing access by the host's proteins to the viral genome for replication and transcription. The genome is replicated by a unique rolling hairpin mechanism. DNA-templated transcription, with some alternative splicing mechanism is the manner of transcription.

== Taxonomy ==
Eleven genera are currently recognized:

- Aquambidensovirus
- Blattambidensovirus
- Diciambidensovirus
- Hemiambidensovirus
- Iteradensovirus
- Miniambidensovirus
- Muscodensovirus
- Pefuambidensovirus
- Protoambidensovirus
- Scindoambidensovirus
- Tetuambidensovirus

Ambidensovirus was previously recognized as a genus, but in 2019 it was split into the six genera prefixed with Aqu-, Blatt-, Hemi-, Pefu-, Proto-, and Scindo-.
