= Tetraparvovirus =

Virus classification
- (unranked): Virus
- Realm: Monodnaviria
- Kingdom: Shotokuvirae
- Phylum: Cossaviricota
- Class: Quintoviricetes
- Order: Piccovirales
- Family: Parvoviridae
- Subfamily: Parvovirinae
- Genus: Tetraparvovirus

Genus of viruses

Tetraparvovirus are a genus of viruses in the family Parvoviridae. The genus contains eight species.

== Description ==
Tetraparvoviruses are small, non enveloped animal viruses with a single-stranded DNA genome between 4 and 6 kb in length. There are 2 open reading frames (ORF) present in the genome. ORF1 encodes the non-structural protein (NS1) and ORF2 encodes the viral capsid proteins (VP1/VP2). Inverted terminal repeats are present at the 5′ and 3′ ends of the genome. Within this family there is a third ORF lying within VP1.

The NS1 protein possesses both helicase and ATPase domains. It has ~652 amino acids residues and a molecular weight of 70–75 kilodaltons (kDa). The VP1 protein contains 900–950 amino acid residues and is ~100 kDa in molecular weight. VP1 has a conserved phospholipase A2 domain which is used by the virion to escape from the endosome.

The third ORF encodes a small protein with a single transmembrane helix spanning 20 amino acid residues in the centre. Its molecular weight is ~10 kDa. The function of this protein is not known.

== Virology ==
These viruses have been isolated from blood, liver, spleen, lymph node and bone marrow.

== Clinical ==
These viruses have not been associated with disease in any of their known hosts to date.

== Taxonomy ==
The genus contains the following species, listed by scientific name and followed by the exemplar virus of the species:

- Tetraparvovirus chiropteran1, Eidolon helvum parvovirus 1
- Tetraparvovirus didelphimorph1, Opossum tetraparvovirus
- Tetraparvovirus primate1, Human parvovirus 4
- Tetraparvovirus rodent1, Rodent tetraparvovirus
- Tetraparvovirus ungulate1, Bovine hokovirus 1
- Tetraparvovirus ungulate2, Porcine hokovirus, also called Porcine parvovirus 3
- Tetraparvovirus ungulate3, Porcine parvovirus 2, also called Parvovirus YX-2010/CHN
- Tetraparvovirus ungulate4, Ovine hokovirus 1

== History ==
The first member of this genus was identified in 2001 in pig serum and designated Porcine parvovirus 2. The first human tetraparvovirus, PARV4, was described in 2005. These new viruses were recognised as being related to but distinct from the known parvoviruses. They were isolated from a group of patients who had engaged in high risk behavior. Other members of this group were isolated from animal sources in Hong Kong. These isolates were originally referred to as Hokoviruses. They have been isolated from wild boars in Germany and chimpanzees and baboons. They have also been isolated from sheep and pigs. Finally, they have been also identified in bats.
