= Aleut (disambiguation) =

Aleut or variation may refer to:

- Aleuts, a peoples found in the Bering Sea/Straits area
- Aleut language, the language spoken by these peoples
- Alutiiq, a people found on the Aleut-Alaska Peninsula and Kodiah Island Archipelago, sometimes called "Aleut"
- Alutiiq language, the language spoken by these people, sometimes called "Aleut"
- Eskaleut languages, a language family of Arctic languages of North America and eastern Asia
- Alaska Peninsula, also called the Aleut Peninsula, the peninsula leading from the Alaska state mainland to the Aleutian Islands
- Aleutian Islands or Aleuts, Aleut Islands; an archipelago linking the Aleut-Alaska Peninsula of North America to the Kamchatka Peninsula of Asia
- Aleutsky District or Aleut District, Kamchatka Krai, Russian Far East, Russia
- The Aleut Corporation (founded 1972), an Alaska Native Regional Corporation for the Aleut people

== See also ==
- Aleutian (disambiguation)
