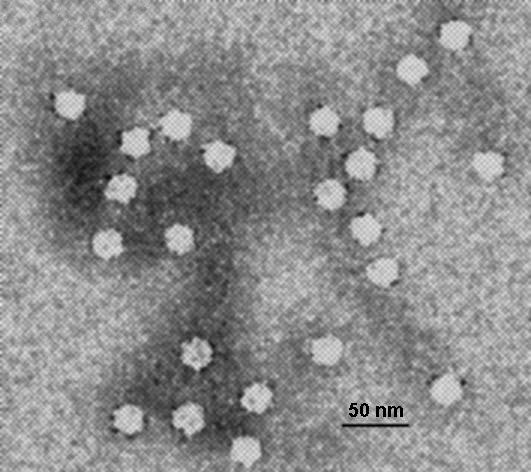
- Electron micrograph of canine parvovirus

Virus classification
- (unranked): Virus
- Realm: Monodnaviria
- Kingdom: Shotokuvirae
- Phylum: Cossaviricota
- Class: Quintoviricetes
- Order: Piccovirales
- Family: Parvoviridae
- Subfamily: Parvovirinae
- Genus: Protoparvovirus

Species
- see text

= Protoparvovirus =

Genus of viruses

Protoparvovirus is a genus of viruses in the Parvovirinae subfamily of the virus family Parvoviridae. Vertebrates serve as natural hosts. There are 23 species in the genus including Protoparvovirus rodent1 for which the exemplar virus is minute virus of mice (MVM). This genus also includes canine parvovirus (CPV), which causes gastrointestinal tract damage in puppies that is about 80% fatal, and porcine parvovirus (PPV), which is a major cause of fetal death and infertility in pigs. The genus divides phylogenetically into two branches, one that contains many founder members of the family, such as MVM, CPV and PPV, which have been studied in considerable detail, and a second branch occupied exclusively by predicted viruses whose coding sequences were identified recently in the wild using virus discovery approaches, but whose biology remains minimally explored. This second branch currently contains two species whose members infect humans, called Protoparvovirus primate1 and Protoparvovirus primate3. Until 2014, the genus was called Parvovirus, but it was renamed to eliminate confusion between members of this genus and members of the entire family Parvoviridae.

== Taxonomy ==
23 species are recognized, many containing several named viruses, virus strains, genotypes or serotypes. When applied to viruses, the definition of species is a little unusual. It is simply an abstract taxonomic concept that clusters a selected range of genetic variants, helping to distinguish branches in a phylogenetic lineage, but it is not a physical entity like a virus that can infect an animal or be isolated. If the diversity level used to define a species is set very low, many will effectively contain a single virus, and the virus and species may even be given the same name, resulting in confusion between the two concepts in the literature, and marginalizing the phylogenetic role of the species taxon. To counter this problem, the diversity level now recognized for species in the Parvoviridae is relatively broad: species are defined as a cluster of similar viruses that encode a particular replication protein, typically called NS1, that is at least 85% identical to the protein encoded by other members of the species.

The genus contains the following species, listed by scientific name and followed by the exemplar virus of the species:

- Protoparvovirus carnivoran1, Canine parvovirus; the species also contains Feline parvovirus
- Protoparvovirus carnivoran2, Sea otter parvovirus
- Protoparvovirus carnivoran3, Canine bufavirus
- Protoparvovirus carnivoran4, Fox parvovirus
- Protoparvovirus carnivoran5, Newlavirus
- Protoparvovirus carnivoran6, ParvoviridaeDogfe372C6
- Protoparvovirus carnivoran7, ParvoviridaeDogfe373C1
- Protoparvovirus carnivoran8, ParvoviridaeDogfe342C1
- Protoparvovirus chiropteran1, Megabat bufavirus 1
- Protoparvovirus chiropteran2, Bat parvovirus BtPk-PV/Switzerland/2019
- Protoparvovirus eulipotyphla1, Mpulungu bufavirus
- Protoparvovirus incertum1, Tusavirus
- Protoparvovirus pinniped1, California sea lion parvovirus Hanchett
- Protoparvovirus primate1, Bufavirus 1a
- Protoparvovirus primate2, Wuharv parvovirus 1
- Protoparvovirus primate3, Cutavirus
- Protoparvovirus rodent1, Minute virus of mice
- Protoparvovirus rodent2, Rat parvovirus 1
- Protoparvovirus rodent3, Rat bufavirus SY-2015
- Protoparvovirus ungulate1, Porcine parvovirus
- Protoparvovirus ungulate2, Porcine bufavirus
- Protoparvovirus ungulate3, Equine protoparvovirus
- Protoparvovirus ungulate4, Porcine parvovirus 8

Protoparvoviruses that infect humans were first discovered in 2012 in the feces of children from Burkina Faso, and named using the siglum bufavirus. Three genotypes of bufaviruses have so far been detected, circulating in Tunisia, Finland and Bhutan

A second virus in this genus that infects humans —cutavirus— was initially isolated from the feces of children with diarrhea.

A third potential human protoparvovirus —tusavirus 1— has been reported in the feces of a single human, but whether or not it is able to infect humans or was simply ingested remains to be clarified.

== Structure ==
Viruses in genus Protoparvovirus have non-enveloped protein capsids around 18–26 nm in diameter, which show T=1 icosahedral symmetry. Genomes are single-stranded linear DNA between 4–6kb in length, with small (100–500b) imperfect palindromic sequences at each terminus that fold to form distinctive duplex hairpin telomeres.

Genus	Structure	Symmetry	Capsid	Genomic arrangement	Genomic segmentation
Protoparvovirus	Icosahedral	T=1	Non-enveloped	Linear ssDNA	No

The capsid is thought to be made up of 60 VP proteins (PDB: 2CAS), both VP1 and VP2.

=== Genomic organization ===
The Protoparvovirus genome has two ORFs. The non-structural ORF (NS) is the "first" on the 5' side, with the structural (VP) on the 3' end. The genome is expressed by extensive alternative splicing. This not only allows for VP to be expressed, but also produces multiple alternatively spliced versions of each ORF, typically called NS1, NS2(P,Y,L), VP1, and VP2. Some examples of annotated proteins from UniProt are:

- NS1 of the Minute virus of mice (MVM), P03134
- NS2 of MVM, P0DJZ2
- VP1 of canine parvovirus (CPV), P17455
- VP2 of CPV, P61826

== Life cycle ==
Viral replication is nuclear. Entry into the host cell is achieved by attachment to host receptors, which mediates clathrin-mediated endocytosis. Replication follows the rolling-hairpin model. In some virus/host cell combinations, progeny virions can be trafficked through the cytoplasm in vesicles and released from the parental host cell prior to cell death, while the remaining virions are released following cell lysis. Vertebrates from 6 orders are currently known to serve as natural hosts. Transmission routes are typically fecal-oral and/or respiratory.

Genus	Host details	Tissue tropism	Entry details	Release details	Replication site	Assembly site	Transmission
Protoparvovirus	Vertebrates	Variable	endocytosis	early vesicular export/cell lysis	Nucleus	Nucleus	fecal-oral or respiratory

== History ==
Kilham rat virus, isolated in 1959, was the first member of this family of small, linear, single-stranded DNA viruses to be identified.

In following years a series of physically similar viruses, including H1, LuIII, minute virus of mice and tumor virus X, were extracted from cells or tissues in routine use in research laboratories and porcine parvovirus, PPV, one of the major causes of reproductive failure in swine, was isolated from infected pigs. In 1971 these viruses were all recognized as part of a taxonomic genus called Parvovirus in the First Report of the newly created International Committee on Taxonomy of Viruses (ICTV)

The Second ICTV Report, published in 1976, established the family Parvoviridae, which at that time included three genera, one of which retained the name Parvovirus and contained all of the aforementioned viruses plus feline panleukopenia virus (now called feline parvovirus, abbreviated to FPV), which had been shown to cause epidemics of enteritis, panleukopenia and congenital cerebellar ataxia in domestic cats. In 1978 a virus from the same species as FPV emerged that was able to infect dogs (called canine parvovirus or CPV), which rapidly spread globally, causing pandemics of severe intestinal and coronary disease.

Genus Parvovirus continued to accrue new viruses until 2014, when its name was changed to Protoparvovirus.
