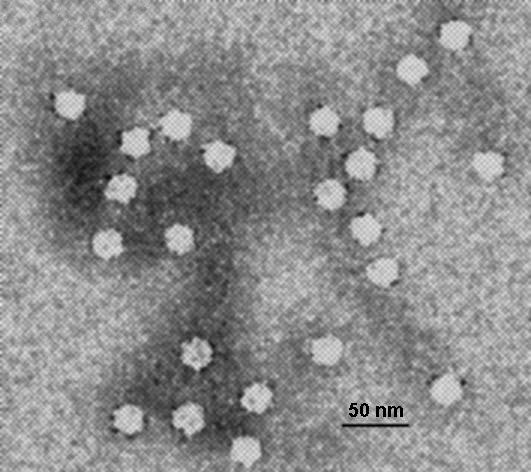
- Electron micrograph of canine parvovirus

Virus classification
- (unranked): Virus
- Realm: Floreoviria
- Kingdom: Shotokuvirae
- Phylum: Cossaviricota
- Class: Quintoviricetes
- Order: Piccovirales
- Family: Parvoviridae
- Genus: Protoparvovirus
- Species: Carnivore protoparvovirus 1
- Virus: Canine parvovirus

= Canine parvovirus =

Contagious virus mainly affecting dogs

Canine parvovirus (also referred to as CPV, CPV2, or parvo) is a contagious virus mainly affecting dogs and wolves. CPV is highly contagious and is spread from dog to dog by direct or indirect contact with their feces. Vaccines can prevent this infection, but mortality can reach 91% in untreated cases. Treatment often involves veterinary hospitalization. Canine parvovirus often infects other mammals including foxes, cats, and skunks. Felines (cats) are also susceptible to panleukopenia, a different strain of parvovirus.

== Signs ==
Dogs that develop the disease show signs of the illness within three to ten days. The signs may include lethargy, vomiting, fever, and diarrhea (usually bloody). Generally, the first sign of CPV is lethargy. Secondary signs are loss of weight and appetite or diarrhea followed by vomiting. Diarrhea and vomiting result in dehydration that upsets the electrolyte balance and this may affect the dog critically. Secondary infections occur as a result of the weakened immune system. Because the normal intestinal lining is also compromised, blood and protein leak into the intestines, leading to anemia and loss of protein, and endotoxins escape into the bloodstream, causing endotoxemia. Dogs have a distinctive odor in the later stages of the infection. The white blood cell level falls, further weakening the dog. Any or all of these factors can lead to shock and death. Younger animals have worse survival rates.

== Diagnosis ==
Diagnosis is made through detection of CPV2 in the feces by either an ELISA or a hemagglutination test, or by electron microscopy. PCR has become available to diagnose CPV2, and can be used later in the disease when potentially less virus is being shed in the feces that may not be detectable by ELISA. Clinically, the intestinal form of the infection can sometimes be confused with coronavirus or other forms of enteritis. Parvovirus, however, is more serious and the presence of bloody diarrhea, a low white blood cell count, and necrosis of the intestinal lining also point more towards parvovirus, especially in an unvaccinated dog. The cardiac form is typically easier to diagnose because the symptoms are distinct.

== Treatment ==
Survival rate depends on how quickly CPV is diagnosed, the age of the dog, and how aggressive the treatment is. There is no approved treatment, and the current standard of care is supportive care, involving extensive hospitalization, due to severe dehydration and potential damage to the intestines and bone marrow. A CPV test should be given as early as possible if CPV is suspected in order to begin early treatment and increase survival rate if the disease is found.

Supportive care ideally also consists of crystalloid IV fluids and/or colloids (e.g., Hetastarch), antinausea injections (antiemetics) such as maropitant, metoclopramide, dolasetron, ondansetron and prochlorperazine, and broad-spectrum antibiotic injections such as cefazolin/enrofloxacin, ampicillin/enrofloxacin, metronidazole, timentin, or enrofloxacin. IV fluids are administered and antinausea and antibiotic injections are given subcutaneously, intramuscularly, or intravenously. The fluids are typically a mix of a sterile, balanced electrolyte solution, with an appropriate amount of B-complex vitamins, dextrose, and potassium chloride. Analgesic medications can be used to counteract the intestinal discomfort caused by frequent bouts of diarrhea; however, the use of opioid analgesics can result in secondary ileus and decreased motility.

In addition to fluids given to achieve adequate rehydration, each time the puppy vomits or has diarrhea in a significant quantity, an equal amount of fluid is administered intravenously. The fluid requirements of a patient are determined by the animal's body weight, weight changes over time, degree of dehydration at presentation, and surface area.

A blood plasma transfusion from a donor dog that has already survived CPV is sometimes used to provide passive immunity to the sick dog. Some veterinarians keep these dogs on site, or have frozen serum available. There have been no controlled studies regarding this treatment. Additionally, fresh frozen plasma and human albumin transfusions can help replace the extreme protein losses seen in severe cases and help assure adequate tissue healing. However, this is controversial with the availability of safer colloids such as Hetastarch, as it will also increase the colloid osmotic pressure without the ill effect of predisposing that canine patient to future transfusion reaction.

Once the dog can keep fluids down, the IV fluids are gradually discontinued, and very bland food slowly introduced. Oral antibiotics are administered for a number of days depending on the white blood cell count and the patient's ability to fight off secondary infection. A puppy with minimal symptoms can recover in two or three days if the IV fluids are begun as soon as symptoms are noticed and the CPV test confirms the diagnosis. If more severe, depending on treatment, puppies can remain ill from five days up to two weeks. However, even with hospitalization, there is no guarantee that the dog will be cured and survive.

=== Treatments in development ===
Kindred Biosciences, a biopharmaceutical company, is developing a monoclonal antibody as a prophylactic therapy to prevent clinical signs of parvovirus infection and also as treatment of established parvovirus infection. In 2021, Kindred Biosciences announced the completion of a pivotal efficacy study showing a 100% survival rate for dogs treated with KIND-030 compared to a 41% survival rate for dogs treated with placebo.

Preliminary research in kidney cell lines have identified nitazoxanide, closantel sodium, and closantel as drugs which have the most potential as broad-spectrum antiviral agents against canine parvovirus and its various subspecies, raising the prospect that these drugs may yield potential for future treatments of this disease.

In May 2023, the USDA granted Elanco Animal Health conditional approval to develop a Canine Parvovirus Monoclonal Antibody (CPMA) which targets the virus instead of its symptoms. Initial distribution of CPMA to veterinarians began in July 2023.

== History ==
Parvovirus CPV2 is a relatively new disease that appeared in the late 1970s. It was first recognized in 1978 and spread worldwide in one to two years. The virus is very similar to feline panleukopenia (also a parvovirus); they are 98% identical, differing only in two amino acids in the viral capsid protein VP2. It is also highly similar to mink enteritis virus (MEV), and the parvoviruses of raccoons and foxes. It is possible that CPV2 is a mutant of an unidentified parvovirus (similar to feline parvovirus (FPV)) of some wild carnivore. CPV2 was thought to only cause diseases in canines, but newer evidence suggest pathogenicity in cats too.

== Variants ==
There are two types of canine parvovirus called canine minute virus (CPV1) and CPV2. CPV2 causes the most serious disease and affects domesticated dogs and wild canids. There are variants of CPV2 called CPV-2a and CPV-2b, identified in 1979 and 1984 respectively. Most of canine parvovirus infection are believed to be caused by these two strains, which have replaced the original strain, and the present day virus is different from the one originally discovered, although they are indistinguishable by most routine tests. An additional variant is CPV-2c, a Glu-426 mutant, and was discovered in Italy, Vietnam, and Spain. The antigenic patterns of 2a and 2b are quite similar to the original CPV2. Variant 2c however has a unique pattern of antigenicity. This has led to claims of ineffective vaccination of dogs, but studies have shown that the existing CPV vaccines based on CPV-2b provide adequate levels of protection against CPV-2c. A strain of CPV-2b (strain FP84) has been shown to cause disease in a small percentage of domestic cats, although vaccination for FPV seems to be protective. With severe disease, dogs can die within 48 to 72 hours without treatment by fluids. In the more common, less severe form, mortality is about 10 percent. Certain breeds, such as Rottweilers, Doberman Pinschers, and Pit bull terriers as well as other black and tan colored dogs may be more susceptible to CPV2. Along with age and breed, factors such as a stressful environment, concurrent infections with bacteria, parasites, and canine coronavirus increase a dog's risk of severe infection. Dogs infected with parvovirus usually die from the dehydration it causes or secondary infection rather than the virus itself.

The variants of CPV-2 are defined by surface protein (VP capsid) features. This classification does not correlate well with phylogenies built from other parts of the viral genome, such as the NS1 protein.

=== Intestinal form ===
Dogs become infected through oral contact with CPV2 in feces, infected soil, or fomites that carry the virus. Following ingestion, the virus replicates in the lymphoid tissue in the throat, and then spreads to the bloodstream. From there, the virus attacks rapidly dividing cells, notably those in the lymph nodes, intestinal crypts, and the bone marrow. There is depletion of lymphocytes in lymph nodes and necrosis and destruction of the intestinal crypts. Anaerobic bacteria that normally reside in the intestines can then cross into the bloodstream, a process known as translocation, with bacteremia leading to sepsis. The most common bacteria involved in severe cases are Clostridium, Campylobacter and Salmonella species. This can lead to a syndrome known as systemic inflammatory response syndrome (SIRS). SIRS leads to a range of complications such as hypercoagulability of the blood, endotoxaemia and acute respiratory distress syndrome (ARDS). Bacterial myocarditis has also been reported secondarily to sepsis. Dogs with CPV are at risk of intussusception, a condition where part of the intestine prolapses into another part. Three to four days following infection, the virus is shed in the feces for up to three weeks, and the dog may remain an asymptomatic carrier and shed the virus periodically. The virus is usually more deadly if the host is concurrently infested with worms or other intestinal parasites.

=== Cardiac form ===
This form is less common and affects puppies infected in the uterus or shortly after birth until about 8 weeks of age. The virus attacks the heart muscle and the puppy often dies suddenly or after a brief period of breathing difficulty due to pulmonary edema. On the microscopic level, there are many points of necrosis of the heart muscle that are associated with mononuclear cellular infiltration. The formation of excess fibrous tissue (fibrosis) is often evident in surviving dogs. Myofibers are the site of viral replication within cells. The disease may or may not be accompanied with the signs and symptoms of the intestinal form. However, this form is now rarely seen due to widespread vaccination of breeding dogs.

Even less frequently, the disease may also lead to a generalized infection in neonates and cause lesions and viral replication and attack in other tissues other than the gastrointestinal tissues and heart, but also brain, liver, lungs, kidneys, and adrenal cortex. The lining of the blood vessels are also severely affected, which lead the lesions in this region to hemorrhage.

=== Infection of the fetus ===
This type of infection can occur when a pregnant female dog is infected with CPV2. The adult may develop immunity with little or no clinical signs of disease. The virus may have already crossed the placenta to infect the fetus. This can lead to several abnormalities. In mild to moderate cases the pups can be born with neurological abnormalities such as cerebellar hypoplasia.

== Virology ==
CPV2 is a non-enveloped single-stranded DNA virus in the Parvoviridae family. The name comes from the Latin parvus, meaning small, as the virus is only 20 to 26 nm in diameter. It has an icosahedral symmetry. The genome is about 5000 nucleotides long. CPV2 continues to evolve, and the success of new strains seems to depend on extending the range of hosts affected and improved binding to its receptor, the canine transferrin receptor. CPV2 has a high rate of evolution, possibly due to a rate of nucleotide substitution that is more like RNA viruses such as Influenzavirus A. In contrast, FPV seems to evolve only through random genetic drift.

CPV2 affects dogs, wolves, foxes, and other canids. CPV2a and CPV2b have been isolated from a small percentage of symptomatic cats and is more common than feline panleukopenia in big cats.

Previously it has been thought that the virus does not undergo cross species infection. However studies in Vietnam have shown that CPV2 can undergo minor antigenic shift and natural mutation to infect felids. Analyses of feline parvovirus (FPV) isolates in Vietnam and Taiwan revealed that more than 80% of the isolates were of the canine parvovirus type, rather than feline panleukopenia virus (FPLV). CPV2 may spread to cats easier than dogs and undergo faster rates of mutation within that species.

== Prevention and decontamination ==
CPV2 is an extremely virulent and contagious virus; the only reliable way to prevent infection is by vaccination. Puppies are generally vaccinated in a series of doses, extending from the earliest time that the immunity derived from the mother wears off until after that passive immunity is definitely gone. Vaccines are performed starting at 7–8 weeks of age, with a booster given every 2–4 weeks until at least 16 weeks of age. Older puppies (16 weeks or older) are given at least two vaccinations 2 to 4 weeks apart. The duration of immunity of vaccines for CPV2 has been tested for all major vaccine manufacturers in the United States and has been found to be at least three years after the initial puppy series and a booster 1 year later.

A dog that successfully recovers from CPV2 generally remains contagious for up to three weeks, but it is possible it may remain contagious for up to six. CPV2 is an extremely resilient virus once it has been shed through the feces into the environment. CPV2 has been found to survive indoors for months and outdoors in moist environments for years. It can survive in extremely low and high temperatures, and is resistant to many chemical disinfectants.
