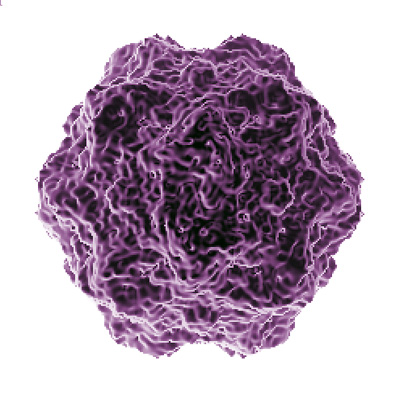

Virus classification
- (unranked): Virus
- Realm: Floreoviria
- Kingdom: Shotokuvirae
- Phylum: Cossaviricota
- Class: Quintoviricetes
- Order: Piccovirales
- Family: Parvoviridae
- Genus: Protoparvovirus
- Species: Protoparvovirus rodent1
- Virus: Minute virus of mice

= Minute virus of mice =

Virus

Minute virus of mice (MVM) is the exemplar virus of the species Protoparvovirus rodent1, in the genus Protoparvovirus of the Parvoviridae family of viruses. MVM exists in multiple variant forms including MVMp, which is the prototype strain that infects cells of fibroblast origin, while MVMi, the immunosuppressive strain, infects T lymphocytes. MVM is a common infection in laboratory mice due to its highly contagious nature. The virus can be shed from infected mice via feces and urine, but also via fomites and nasal secretions. Typically there are no clinical signs of infection in adult mice, however, experimental infection can cause multiple organ damage during fetal development or shortly after birth.

== Transcription profile ==
MVM uses two transcriptional promoters at map units (mu) 4 and 38 (p4 and p38) and a single polyadenylation site at mu 95 to create 3 major size classes of mRNAs, referred to as R1, R2 and R3, all of which have a short intron sequence between 46–48 mu removed. R1 is produced from p4 and is translated into non-structural protein 1 (NS1). However, in some P4 transcripts a second intron between 10–40 mu is also excised, creating R2 mRNAs that encode NS2 proteins of ~25 kDa. These share 85 amino acids of N-terminal sequence with NS1, and then splice into an alternate reading frame before finally reaching the short central intron where 2 different C-terminal hexapeptides can be added. The R3 transcript produces capsid proteins VP1 and VP2, which requires transcription from the P38 promoter, in contrast to the P4 promoter used for transcripts R1 and R2.

== Non-structural protein functions ==
NS1 functions as a required replication protein and is known to have helicase activity, ATPase activity and nickase activity. Specifically, the nickase activity is required to resolve replication intermediate telomeres on the right-hand of the genome. NS2 is known to exist in several spliced forms (isoforms) termed NS2-P, -Y and –L due to differences in the C-terminus of the isoforms as a result of alternative splicing. NS2 is known to exist is both the cytoplasm and nucleus as well as in phosphorylated and non-phosphorylated forms. In addition, NS2 is required for efficient infection in its natural murine host, but is dispensable in experimental infection in human cell lines. Although not fully understood, in murine A9 fibroblasts NS2 interacts with nuclear export factor Crm1 resulting in efficient nuclear egress of progeny virions.

== DNA damage response ==
MVM induces a DNA damage response (DDR) during infection which is required for effective replication. The ATM pathway is exclusively activated with a primarily Chk2-mediated response. It is not known if viral proteins or active viral replication activate the DDR, but UV-inactivated MVM does not induce a response suggesting that presence of MVM virions or MVM genome alone cannot cause the observed DDR activation.

== Commercial uses ==
Production and purification of biological products includes processes to remove potential viral contaminants. Viral reduction strategies are challenged (tested) with a virus that can be readily quantified. The Minute virus of Mice is the physically smallest virus that can be easily quantified; as such it is used as a "worst case" example of a very small virus to challenge virus reduction strategies.
