= List of ginseng diseases and pests =

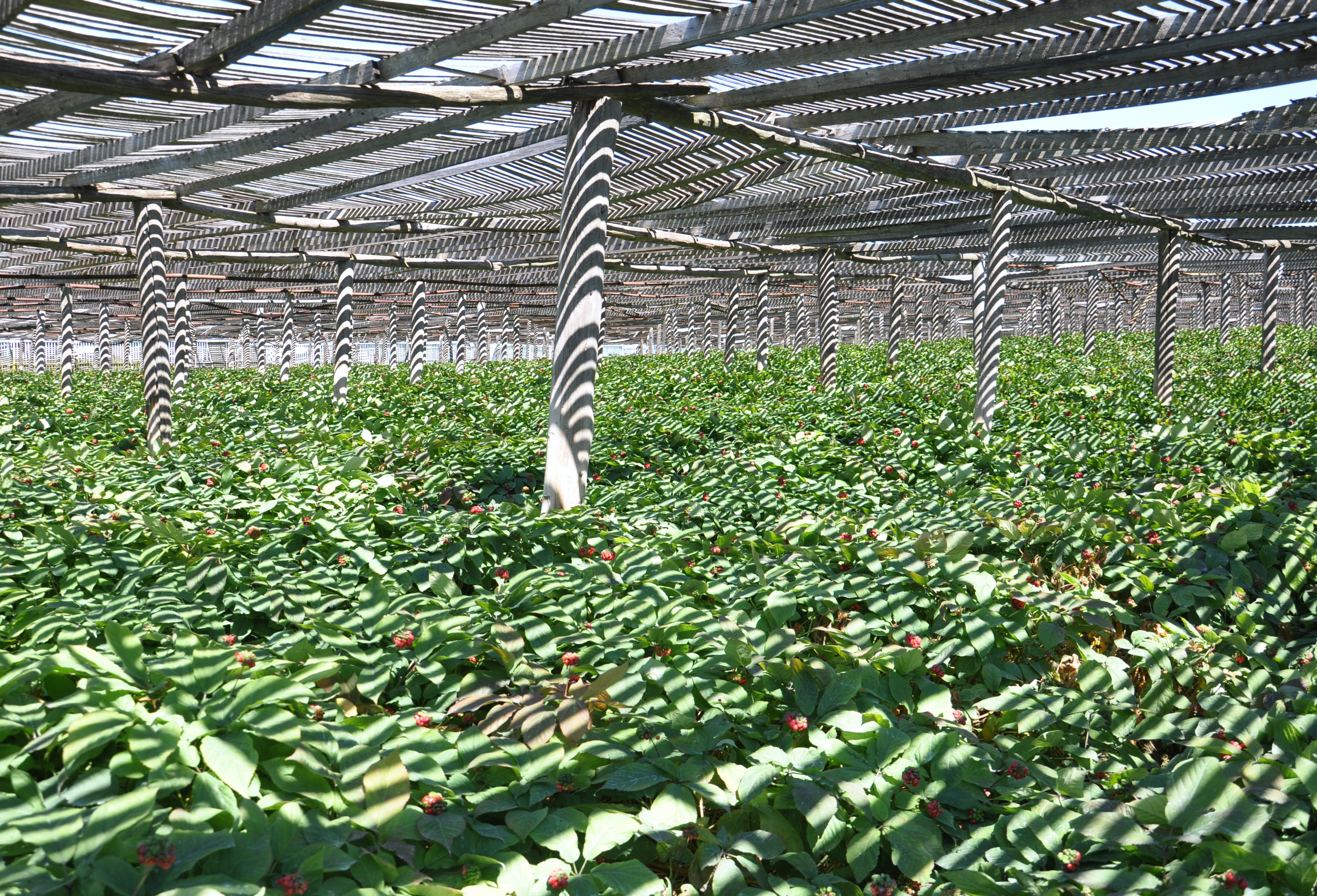
Healthy American ginseng (P. quinquefolius) in late fall with red berries, grown under wooden shade in Monk Ginseng Garden, in Weston, Wisconsin, United States

Ginseng is an agricultural product affected by many plant pathogens and pests. Roots are harvested from the wild, or cultivated agriculturally. The information here concerns "true" ginseng species in the genus Panax.

== Fungi ==
- Actinomucor
- Alternaria
  - Alternaria alternata (black spot disease)
  - Alternaria panax (black spot disease)
- Aschersonia
- Aspergillus
- Botrytis cinerea (gray mold disease)
- Chalara
- Cladosporium
- Clonostachys
- Colletotrichum
  - Colletotrichum gloeosporioides (anthracnose disease)
  - Colletotrichum dematium (anthracnose disease)
- Cylindrocarpon
  - Cylindrocarpon panacis (root rot disease)
- Diploceccium
- Epicoccum
- Erysiphe
  - Erysiphe panacis
- Eutypella
  - Eutypella scoparia
- Fusarium
  - Fusarium flocciferum
  - Fusarium oxysporum (root rot disease)
  - Fusarium solani (root rot disease)
- Golovinomyces biocellatus, formerly Oidium erysiphoides (P. notoginseng powdery mildew disease)
- Haematonectria
- Ilyonectria
  - Ilyonectria crassa
  - Ilyonectria destructans, formerly Cylindrocarpon destructans (root rot disease)
  - Ilyonectria liliigena
  - Ilyonectria mors-panacis
  - Ilyonectria panacis
  - Ilyonectria robusta
- Magnaporthe
- Meloderma
- Mycocentrospora
  - Mycocentrospora acerina (round spot disease)
- Neonectria
- Neurospora
  - Neurospora sitophila
- Pestalotiopsis
- Phoma
  - Phoma herbarum
- Phomopsis
- Plectosphaerella
  - Plectosphaerella cucumerina
- Ramularia
- Rhexocercosporidium panacis
- Rhizoctonia
  - Rhizoctonia solani (blight disease)
- Rhizopus
- Sclerotiniaceae
  - Sclerotinia
- Thelonectria
- Verticillium

== Oomycota ==
- Phytophthora (root rot disease)
  - Phytophthora cactorum (root rot disease)
  - Phytophthora citricola
- Pythium
  - Pythium altimum
  - Pythium irregulare

== Bacteria ==
- Pseudomonas (root rot disease)
  - Pseudomonas marginalis, formerly Pseudomonas panacis (rusty root)

== Viruses ==
- Potyvirus panax, formerly Panax virus Y
- Begomovirus solanumflavuschinaense, formerly Tomato yellow leaf curl China virus
- Betasatellite solaniflavuschinaense, formerly Tomato yellow leaf curl China betasatellite
- P. notoginseng virus A
- Polerovirus TVDV, formerly tobacco vein distorting virus

== Animals ==
- Acusta despecta sieboldtiana
- Ditylenchus destructor
- Meloidogyne hapla (root-knot nematode disease)
- Slugs

== Endophytes ==
Endophytes are symbiotic organisms that are not pathogenic.

- Drechmeria panacis
- Trichoderma panacis
- Verruconis panacis
