= Chinese virus =

Chinese virus or China virus may refer to:

- A term for SARS-CoV-2 and COVID-19, sometimes used offensively and dysphemistically.
- Chinese virus (politics) – critique of China's influence in politics
- Plant viruses affecting species in the potato/tomato family:
  - Clerodendrum golden mosaic China virus
  - Tomato leaf curl China virus
  - Tomato yellow leaf curl China virus

== See also ==
- Chinese coronavirus (disambiguation)
- Lists of virus taxa, including several species of virus having specific names with Chinese demonyms and geonyms
