= Cabernet Sauvignon =

Red-wine variety of grape

- Grape (Vitis)
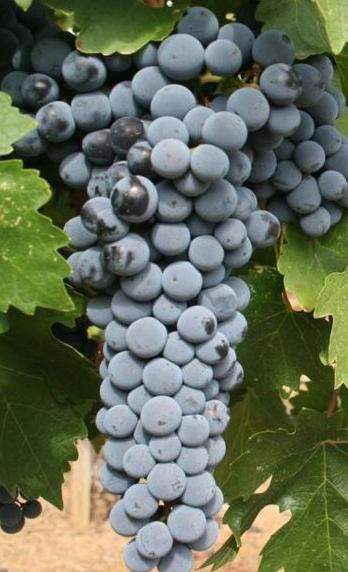
- Cabernet Sauvignon grapes in Red Mountain, Washington
- Color of berry skin: Black
- Also called: Bouchet, Bouche, Petit-Bouchet, Petit-Cabernet, Petit-Vidure, Vidure, Sauvignon Rouge
- Notable regions: Bordeaux, Tuscany, Napa Valley, Paso Robles AVA, Sonoma County, Australia, Margaret River, South Africa, Friuli, British Columbia, Canada
- Notable wines: Classified Bordeaux estates, Californian cult wines
- Ideal soil: Gravel
- Hazards: Underripeness, powdery mildew, eutypella scoparia, excoriose
- VIVC number: 1929

Wine characteristics
- General: Dense, dark, tannic
- Cool climate: Vegetal, bell pepper, asparagus
- Medium climate: Mint, black pepper, eucalyptus
- Hot climate: Jam

Cabernet Sauvignon (French: [kabɛʁnɛ soviɲɔ̃]) is one of the world's most widely recognized red wine grape varieties. It is grown in nearly every major wine producing country among a diverse spectrum of climates from Australia and British Columbia, Canada to Lebanon's Beqaa Valley.

This grape variety appeared in France in the 17th century as a result of natural crossbreeding. Its popularity is often attributed to its ease of cultivation—the grapes have thick skins and the vines are hardy and naturally low yielding, budding late to avoid frost and resistant to viticulture hazards.

The classic profile of Cabernet Sauvignon tends to be full-bodied wines with high tannins and noticeable acidity that contributes to the wine's aging potential. In cool areas, it has flavors of blackcurrant and green pepper; in warmer places, it may taste like black cherry and olive; in very hot climates, it can have a jammy flavor.

== History and origins ==
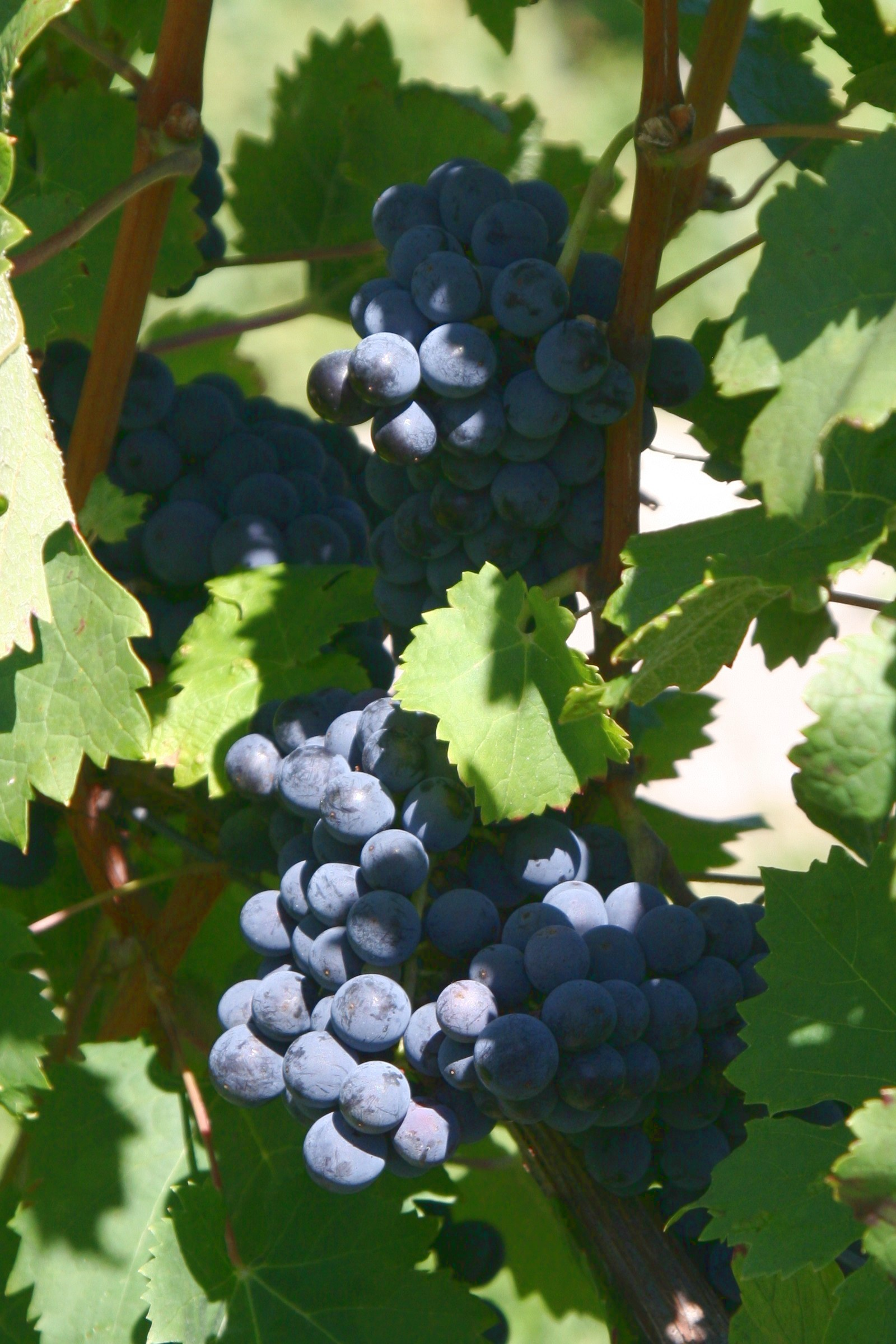
Cabernet Franc

For many years, the origin of Cabernet Sauvignon was not clearly understood, and many myths and conjectures surrounded it. Until recently, the grape was rumoured to have ancient origins, perhaps even being the Biturica grape used to make ancient Roman wine and referenced by Pliny the Elder. This belief was widely held in the 18th century, when the grape was also known as Petite Vidure or Bidure, apparently a corruption of Biturica. There was also a belief that Vidure was a reference to the hardwood (French vigne dure) of the vine, with a possible relationship to Carménère which was once known as Grand Vidure. Another theory was that the grapevine originated in the Rioja region of Spain.

While the period when the name Cabernet Sauvignon became more prevalent over Petite Vidure is not certain, records indicate that the grape was a popular Bordeaux planting in the 18th century Médoc region. The first estates known to have actively grown the variety (and the likely source of Cabernet vines for other estates) were Château Mouton and Château d'Armailhac in Pauillac.

The grape's true origins were discovered in 1996 with the use of DNA typing at the UC Davis Department of Viticulture and Enology by a team led by Carole Meredith. The DNA evidence determined that Cabernet Sauvignon was the offspring of Cabernet franc and Sauvignon blanc and was most likely a chance crossing that occurred in the 17th century. Before this discovery, this origin had been suspected from the similarity of the grapes' names and the fact that Cabernet Sauvignon shares similar aromas with both grapes—such as the blackcurrant and pencil box aromas of Cabernet franc and the grassiness of Sauvignon blanc. In 2016, scientists at the UC Davis announced they had sequenced a draft of the whole genome of the Cabernet Sauvignon grape, the first genome of a commercial wine-producing grape to be sequenced. A later haplotype-based genomic study published in 2026 proposed that berry colour locus inheritance in Cabernet sauvignon was more consistent with a Sauvignon gris lineage. The study suggested that the close genetic relationship between Sauvignon blanc and Sauvignon gris may have limited the resolution of earlier SSR marker-based parentage analyses published in 1997.

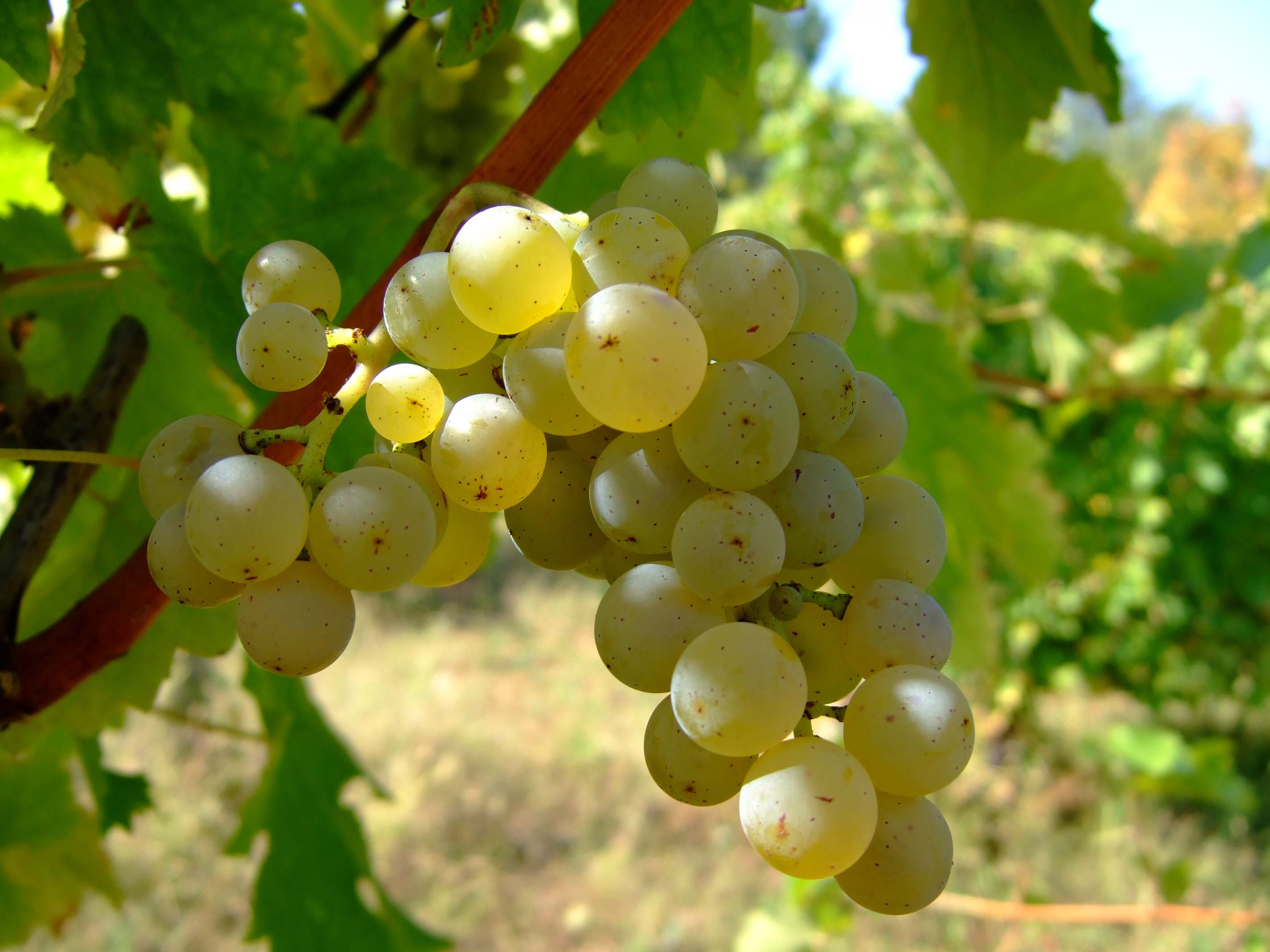
Sauvignon blanc

=== Offspring and White Cabernet ===
While not as prolific in mutating as Pinot noir, nor as widely used in the production of offspring, Cabernet Sauvignon has been linked to other grape varieties. In 1961, a cross of Cabernet Sauvignon and Grenache produced the French wine grape Marselan. Cygne blanc is a white-berried seedling of Cabernet Sauvignon that was discovered in 1989 growing in a garden in Swan Valley, Western Australia. Cabernet blanc is a crossing of Cabernet Sauvignon and an unknown hybrid grape variety that was discovered in Switzerland in the late 20th century.

In 1977 a vine producing 'bronze' grapes was found in the vineyards of Cleggett Wines in Australia. They propagated this mutant, registered it under the name of Malian, and sold pale red wines under that name. In 1991 one of the Bronze Cabernet vines started producing white grapes. Cleggett registered this "White Cabernet" under the name of Shalistin. Compared to its Cabernet parent, Malian appears to lack anthocyanins in the subepidermal cells but retains them in the epidermis, whereas Shalistin has no anthocyanins in either layer. The team that went on to discover the VvMYBA1 and VvMYBA2 genes that control grape colour have suggested that a gene involved in anthocyanin production has been deleted in the subepidermis of Malian, and then subepidermal cells invaded the epidermis to produce Shalistin.

During a series of trials between 1924 and 1930, the pollen of Cabernet Sauvignon was used to fertilize Glera vines (the white wine grape used to make the sparkling wine Prosecco) to create the red Italian wine grape Incrocio Manzoni 2.15.

In 1972, the Australian agency CSIRO crossed Cabernet Sauvignon grapes with the Spanish Sumoll variety to create three new varieties: Cienna, Tyrian and Rubienne.

In 1983, Cabernet Sauvignon was crossed with the white German wine grape Bronner to create the white wine grape Souvignier gris.

== Viticulture ==
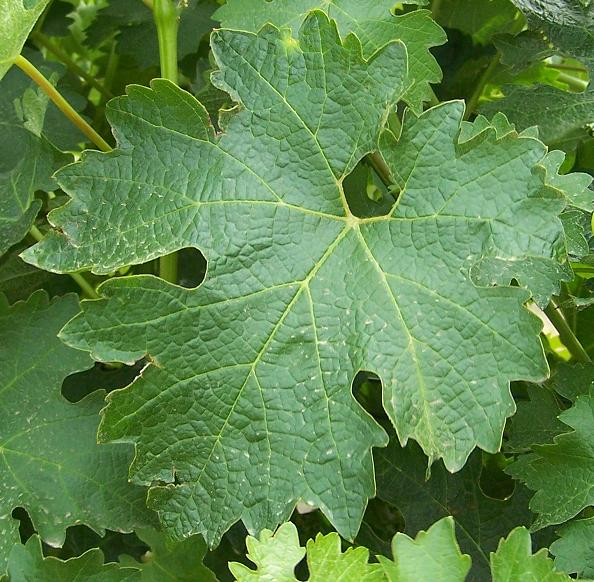
Cabernet Sauvignon leaf. In cooler climate conditions, vines will focus more energy in producing foliage, which is needed to capture sunlight for photosynthesis, rather than ripening grapes. This makes canopy management and aggressive pruning an important consideration for growers.

While Cabernet Sauvignon can grow in a variety of climates, its suitability as a varietal wine or as a blend component is strongly influenced by the warmth of the climate. The vine is one of the last major grape varieties to bud and ripen (typically 1–2 weeks after Merlot and Cabernet franc), and the climate of the growing season affects how early the grapes will be harvested. Many wine regions in California give the vine an abundance of sunshine with few problems in ripening fully, which increases the likelihood of producing varietal Cabernet wines. In regions like Bordeaux, under the threat of inclement harvest season weather, Cabernet Sauvignon is often harvested a little earlier than ideal and blended with other grapes to fill in the gaps. In some regions, the climate will be more important than the soil. In regions that are too cool, there is a potential for more herbaceous and green bell pepper flavours from less than ideally ripened grapes. In regions where the grape is exposed to excess warmth and over-ripening, there is a propensity for the wine to develop flavours of cooked or stewed blackcurrants.

The Cabernet grape variety has thrived in a variety of vineyard soil types, making the consideration of soil less of a concern, particularly for New World winemakers. In Bordeaux, the soil aspect of terroir was historically an important consideration in determining which of the major Bordeaux grape varieties were planted. While Merlot seemed to thrive in clay- and limestone-based soils (such as those of the Right Bank regions of the Gironde estuary), Cabernet Sauvignon seemed to perform better in the gravel-based soil of the Médoc region on the Left Bank. The gravel soils offered the benefit of being well drained while absorbing and radiating heat to the vines, aiding ripening. Clay- and limestone-based soils are often cooler, allowing less heat to reach the vines, and delaying ripening. In regions where the climate is warmer, there is more emphasis on soil that is less fertile, which promotes less vigour in the vine, which can keep yields low. In the Napa Valley wine regions of Oakville and Rutherford, the soil is more alluvial and dusty. Rutherford Cabernet Sauvignon has been often quoted as giving a sense of terroir with a taste of "Rutherford dust". In the South Australian wine region of Coonawarra, Cabernet Sauvignon has produced vastly different results from grape vines planted in the region's terra rosa soil – so much so that the red soil is considered the "boundary" of the wine region, with some controversy from wine growers with Cabernet Sauvignon, planted on red soil.

In addition to ripeness levels, the harvest yields can also have a strong influence on the resulting quality and flavours of Cabernet Sauvignon wine. The vine itself is prone to vigorous yields, particularly when planted on the vigorous SO4 rootstock. Excessive yields can result in less concentrated and flavorful wine with flavours more on the green or herbaceous side. In the 1970s, a particular clone of Cabernet Sauvignon that was engineered to be virus free was noted for its very high yields-causing many quality-conscious producers to replant their vineyards in the late 20th century with different clonal varieties. To reduce yields, producers can plant the vines on less vigorous rootstock and also practice green harvesting with aggressive pruning of grape clusters soon after veraison.

In general, Cabernet Sauvignon has good resistance to most grape diseases, powdery mildew being the most noted exception. It is, however, susceptible to the vine diseases Eutypella scoparia and excoriose.

=== The "green bell pepper" flavor ===
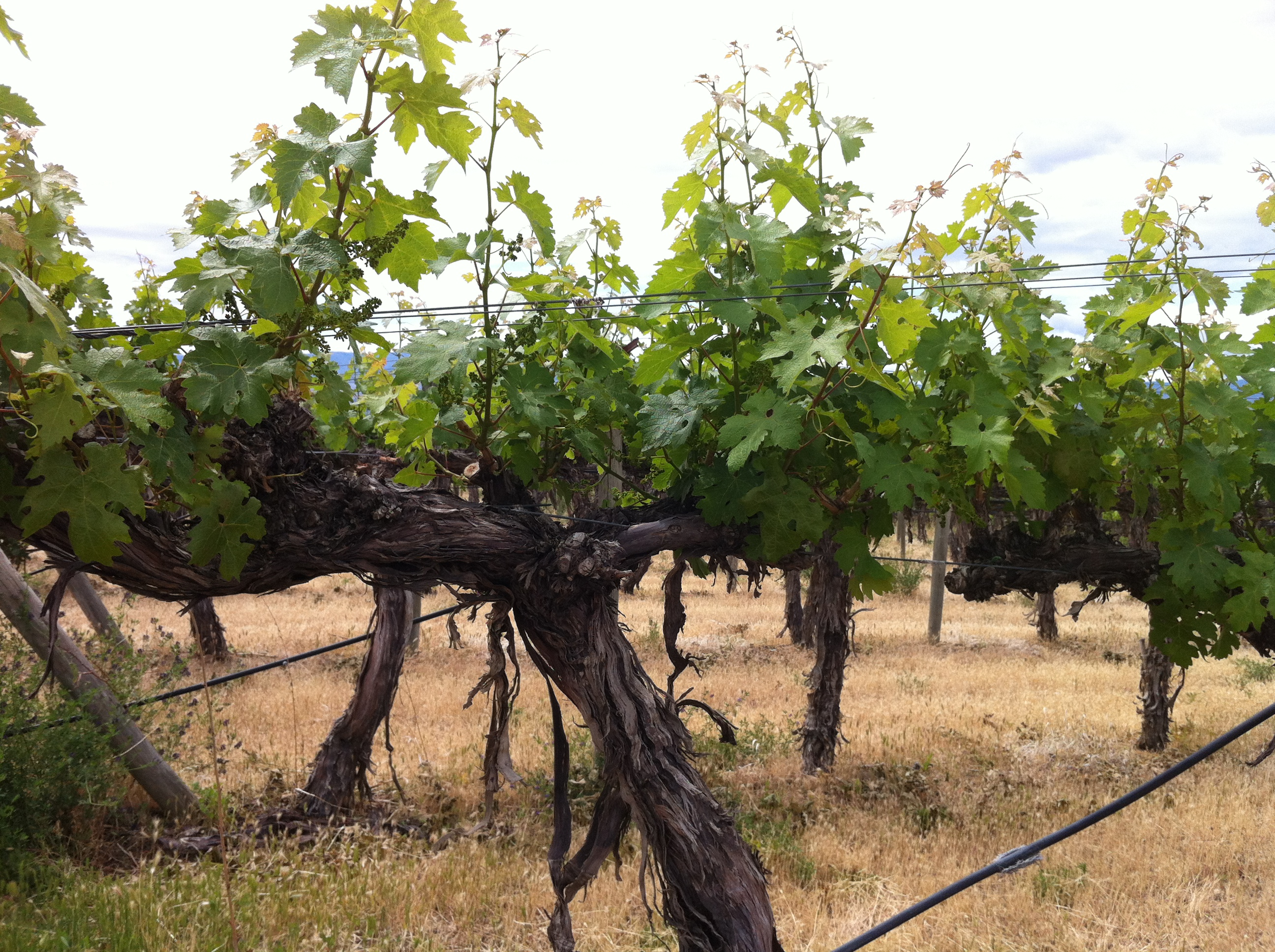
Cabernet Sauvignon in Washington State, planted in 1973 at Red Willow Vineyard in the Yakima Valley.

A couple of noted Cabernet Sauvignon flavours are intimately tied to viticultural and climate influences. The herbaceous or green bell pepper flavour is most widely recognised, caused by pyrazines, which are more prevalent in under-ripened grapes. Pyrazine compounds are present in all Cabernet Sauvignon grapes and are gradually destroyed by sunlight as the grape continues to ripen. To the human palate, this compound is detectable in wines with pyrazine levels as low as 2 nanograms (ng) per litre. At the time of veraison, when the grapes first start to ripen fully, there is the equivalent pyrazine level of 30 ng/L. In cooler climates, getting Cabernet Sauvignon grapes to ripen fully to the point where pyrazine is not detected is difficult. The green bell pepper flavour is not considered a wine fault, but it may not be desirable to all consumers' tastes. The California wine region of Monterey was noted in the late 20th century for its very vegetal Cabernet Sauvignon with pronounced green pepper flavour, earning the nickname "Monterey veggies". In addition to its cool climate, Monterey is also prone to being very windy, which can shut down the grape vines and further inhibit ripeness.

Two other well-known Cabernet Sauvignon flavours are mint and eucalyptus. Mint flavours are often associated with wine regions that are warm enough to have low pyrazine levels but are still generally cool, such as Australia's Coonawarra region and some areas of Washington State. Some believe that soil could also contribute to the minty notes since the flavour also appears in some wines from the Pauillac region but not from the similar climate of Margaux. Resinous Eucalyptus flavours tend to appear in regions that are habitats for the eucalyptus tree, such as California's Napa and Sonoma valleys and parts of Australia, but there has been no evidence to conclusively prove a direct link between proximity of eucalyptus trees and the presence of that flavour in the wine.

== Winemaking ==
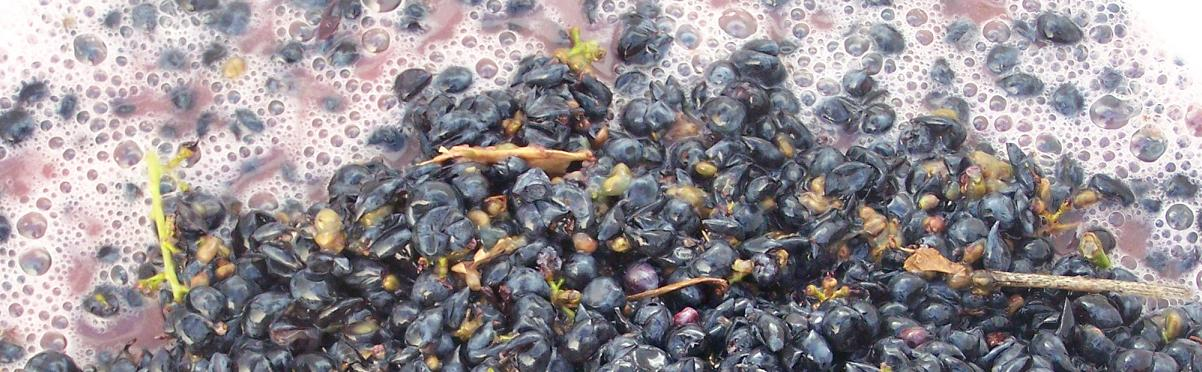
During the maceration period, color, flavor and tannins are extracted from the skins. The addition of stems and seeds will increase the tannic content of the wine.

In many aspects, Cabernet Sauvignon can reflect the desires and personality of the winemaker while still presenting familiar flavours that express the typical character of the variety. The most pronounced effects are from the use of oak during production. Typically the first winemaking decision is whether or not to produce a varietal or blended wine. The "Bordeaux blend" of Cabernet Sauvignon, Merlot and Cabernet franc, with potentially some Malbec, Petit Verdot or Carménère, is the classic example of blended Cabernet Sauvignon, emulated in the United States with wines produced under the "Meritage" designation. But Cabernet Sauvignon can be blended with a variety of grapes such as Shiraz, Tempranillo and Sangiovese. The decision to blend is then followed by the decision of when to do the blending—before, during or after fermentation. Due to the different fermentation styles of the grapes, many producers will ferment and age each grape variety separately and blend the wine shortly before bottling.

The Cabernet Sauvignon grape itself is very small, with a thick skin, creating a high 1:12 ratio of seed (pip) to fruit (pulp). From these elements, the high proportions of phenols and tannins can have a stark influence on the structure and flavour of the wine—especially if the must is subjected to long periods of maceration (skin contact) before fermentation. In Bordeaux, the maceration period was traditionally three weeks, which gave the winemaking staff enough time to close down the estate after harvest to take a hunting holiday. These long maceration periods result in very tannic and flavorful wines that require years of ageing. Wine producers wishing to make a wine more approachable within a couple of years will drastically reduce the maceration time to as little as a few days. Following maceration, the Cabernet must be fermented at high temperatures of up to 30 °C (86 °F). The fermentation temperature will play a role in the result, with deeper colours and more flavour components being extracted at higher temperatures while more fruit flavours are maintained at a lower temperature. In Australia, there has been experimentation with carbonic maceration to make softer, fruity Cabernet Sauvignon wines.

The tannic nature of Cabernet Sauvignon is an important winemaking consideration. As the must is exposed to prolonged maceration periods, more tannins are extracted from the skin and will be present in the resulting wine. If winemakers choose not to shorten the period of maceration in favour of maximizing colour and flavour concentrations, there are some methods that they can use to soften tannin levels. A common method is oak ageing, which exposes the wine to gradual levels of oxidation that can mellow the harsh grape tannins as well as introduce softer "wood tannins". The choice of fining agents can also reduce tannins with gelatin and egg whites being positively-charged proteins that are naturally attracted to the negatively charged tannin molecules. These fining agents will bond with some of the tannins and be removed from the wine during filtration. One additional method is micro-oxygenation, which mimics some of the gradual aeration that occurs with barrel ageing, with the limited exposure to oxygen aiding in the polymerization of the tannins into larger molecules, which are perceived on the palate as being softer.

=== Affinity for oak ===
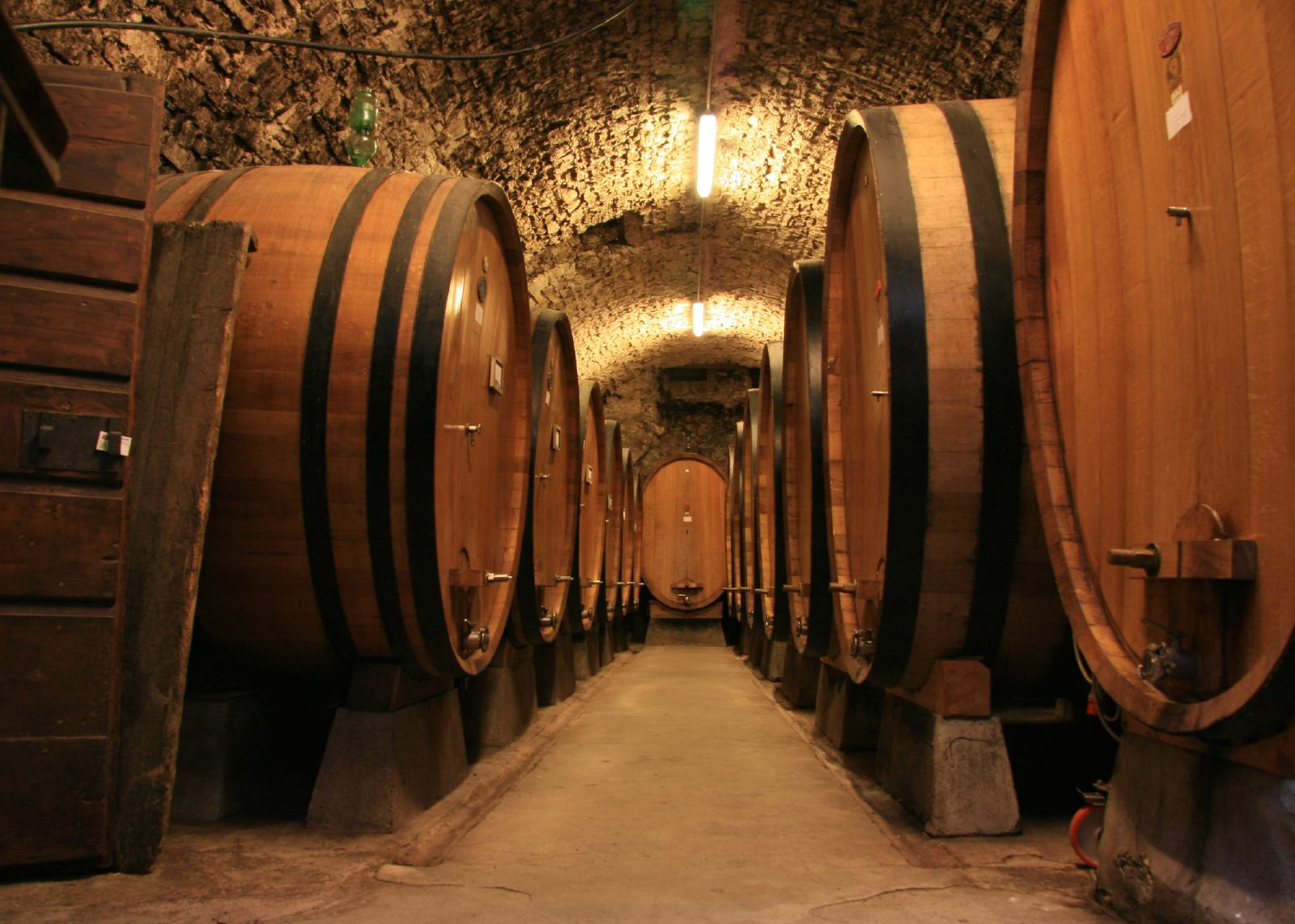
Large oak barrels, like these used in Tuscany bring less wine into contact with the wood and therefore leave the resulting wine with less oak influence.

One of the most noted traits of Cabernet Sauvignon is its affinity for oak, either during fermentation or in barrel aging. In addition to having a softening effect on the grape's naturally high tannins, the unique wood flavours of vanilla and baking spice complement the natural grape flavours of blackcurrant and tobacco. The particular success of Cabernet-based Bordeaux blends in the 225 litres (59 gallons) barrique significantly influenced that barrel size one of the most popular worldwide. In winemaking, the decision for the degree of oak influence (as well as which type of oak) will strongly impact the resulting wine. American oak, particularly from new barrels, imparts more robust oak flavours less subtle than those imparted by French oak. Even within the American oak family, the location of the oak source also plays a role, with oak from the state of Oregon having a more pronounced influence on Cabernet Sauvignon than oak from Missouri, Pennsylvania and Virginia. Winemakers often use a variety of oak barrels from different locations and of different ages and blend the wine as if they are blending different grape varieties.

Winemakers can also control the influence of oak by using alternatives to the standard barrique barrels. Larger barrels have a smaller wood-to-wine ratio and, therefore, less pronounced oak flavours. Winemakers in Italy and Portugal sometimes use barrels made from other wood types such as chestnut and redwood. Another method that winemakers consider is tea bagging with oak chips or adding oak planks to the wines while fermenting or ageing it in stainless steel tanks. While these methods are less costly than oak barrels, they create more pronounced oak flavours, which tend not to mellow or integrate with the rest of the wine's components, nor do they provide the gradual oxidation benefit of barrel ageing.

== Wine regions ==
=== Bordeaux ===
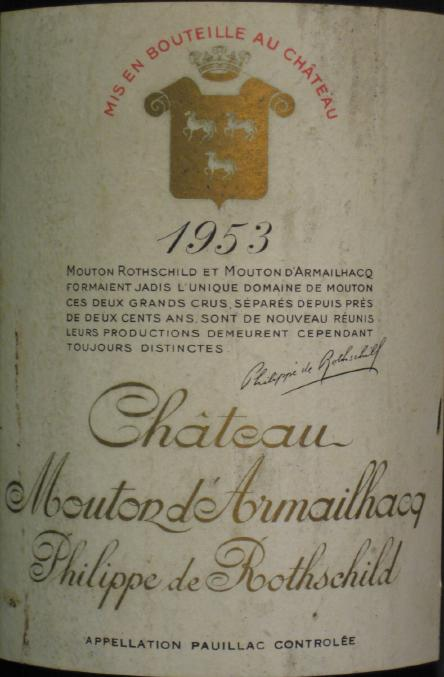
Armand d'Armailhac of Château d'Armailhac (bottle picture) and Baron Hector de Brane of Château Mouton were important figures in the establishment of Cabernet Sauvignon in Bordeaux.

The Bordeaux wine region is intimately connected with Cabernet Sauvignon, even though wine is rarely made without the blended component of other grape varieties. It is the likely place of origin of the vine, and producers across the globe have invested heavily in trying to reproduce the structure and complexity of Bordeaux wines. While the "Bordeaux blend" of Cabernet Sauvignon, Cabernet Franc and Merlot created the earliest examples of acclaimed Cabernet Sauvignon wine, Cabernet Sauvignon was first blended in Bordeaux with Syrah (from the Northern Rhone), a pairing that is widely seen in Australia and some vin de pays wines from the Languedoc.

The decision to first start blending Cabernet Sauvignon was partly derived from financial necessity. The sometimes temperamental and unpredictable climate of Bordeaux during the "Little Ice Age" did not guarantee a successful harvest every year; producers had to insure themselves against the risk of losing an entire vintage by planting a variety of grapes. Over time it was discovered that the unique characteristics of each grape variety could complement each other and enhance the quality of the wine. Cabernet Sauvignon added structure, acidity, tannins and aging potential as a base or backbone of the wine. By itself, particularly when harvested at less than ideal ripeness, it can lack a sense of fruit or "fleshiness" on the palate which can be compensated by adding the rounder flavours of Merlot. Cabernet franc can add more aromas to the bouquet and more fruitiness. In the lighter soils of the Margaux region, Cabernet-based wines can lack colour, which can be achieved by blending in Petit Verdot. Malbec, used today mostly in Fronsac, can add other fruit and floral aromas.

DNA evidence has shown Cabernet Sauvignon is the result of crossing two other Bordeaux grape varieties— Cabernet franc and Sauvignon blanc— which has led grapevine historians, or ampelographers, to believe that the grape originated in Bordeaux. Early records indicate that the grape was widespread in the Médoc region during the 18th century. The loose berry clusters and thick skins of the grape provided an excellent resistance to rot in the sometimes wet maritime climate of Bordeaux. The grape continued to grow in popularity until the Powdery mildew epidemic of 1852 exposed Cabernet Sauvignon's sensitivity to that grape disease. With vineyards severely ravaged or lost, many Bordeaux wine growers turned to Merlot, increasing its plantings to where it soon became the most widely planted grape in Bordeaux. As the region's winemakers started to understand better the area's terroir and how the different grape varieties performed in other regions, Cabernet Sauvignon increased in plantings all along the Left Bank region of the Gironde river in the Médoc as well as Graves region, where it became the dominant variety in the wine blends. In the Right bank regions of Saint-Émilion and Pomerol, Cabernet is a distant third in plantings behind Merlot & Cabernet franc.

In the wine regions of the Left Bank, the Cabernet influence of the wine has shown unique characteristics in the different regions. In Saint-Estèphe and Pessac-Léognan, the grape develops more mineral flavours. Aromas of violets are a characteristic of Margaux. Pauillac is noted by a strong lead pencil scent and Saint-Julien by cedar and cigar boxes. The Cabernet wines of the Moulis are characterized by their soft tannins and rich fruit flavours while the southern Graves region is characterized by strong blackcurrant flavours, though in less intense wines overall. The percentage of Cabernet Sauvignon used in the blend will depend on terroir and the winemakers' styles as well as the vintage. The First Growth estates of Château Mouton Rothschild and Château Latour are noted for regularly producing wines with some of the highest percentages of Cabernet— often around 75%.

A common factor affecting Bordeaux wines' flavours is Cabernet Sauvignon's harvest yields. Throughout Bordeaux, there is a legal maximum permitted yield of 50 hectoliters (hl) per hectare (ha). With the aid of global warming and vigorous rootstocks, many Bordeaux vineyards can easily surpass 60 hl/ha, with some estates taking advantage of the legal loophole of plafond limite de classement ("ceiling limit classification") that permits higher yields during "exceptional" years. This has had an adverse effect on the quality of production from some producers who regularly use grapes harvested at excessive yields. In recent years there has been more of an emphasis on keeping yields low, particularly for an estate's Grand vin.

==== Other French regions ====
The Bordeaux wine region accounts for more than 60% of the Cabernet Sauvignon grown in France. Outside of Bordeaux, Cabernet Sauvignon is found in varying quantities throughout Le Midi and in the Loire Valley. Cabernet Sauvignon wines are generally lighter and less structured, drinkable much earlier than Bordeaux wine. In the southwest French appellation d'origine contrôlée (AOCs) of Bergerac and Buzet it is used to make rosé wine. In some regions, it is used to add flavour and structure to Carignan while it is blended with Négrette in Gaillac and Fronton as well as Tannat in Madiran. In Provence, the grape had some presence in the region in the mid-19th century, when viticulturist Jules Guyot recommended it as a blending partner with Syrah. In recent years, several Midi wine estates, such as Mas de Daumas Gassac have received international acclaim for their Cabernet Sauvignon blended in Hérault, with Rhône grapes like Syrah. It is often made as a single varietal in the vin de pays of the Languedoc. The influence of Australian flying winemakers has been considerable in how Cabernet Sauvignon is treated by some Languedoc wine estates, with some producers making wines that can seem like they are from the New World. Overall, the grape has not exerted its dominance of the region, generally considered less ideally situated to the dry climate than Syrah. The Languedoc producers, who give serious consideration to Cabernet Sauvignon, generally rely on irrigation to compensate for the climate.

=== Italy ===
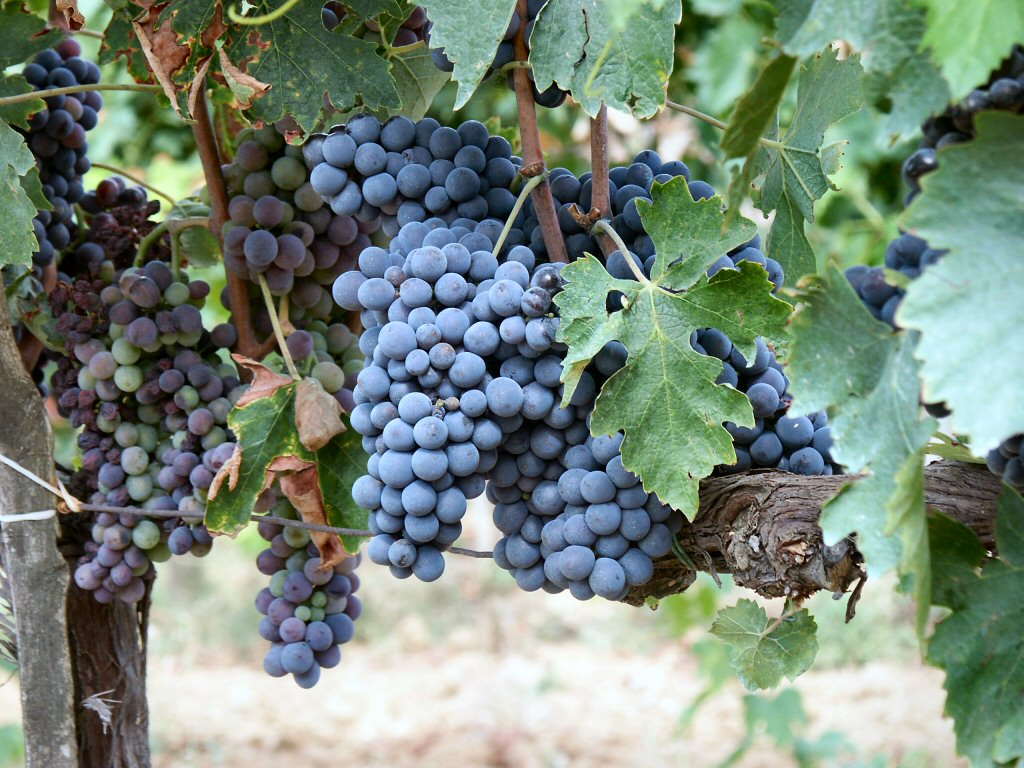
In the 1970s, Italian winemakers started to blend Cabernet Sauvignon with Sangiovese (pictured) to create wines known as "Super Tuscans".

Cabernet Sauvignon has a long history in Italian wines, being first introduced to the Piedmont region in 1820. In the mid-1970s, the grape earned notoriety and controversy as a component in the so-called "Super Tuscan" wines of Tuscany. Today the grape is permitted in several Denominazioni di origine controllata (DOCs) and is used in many Indicazione Geografica Tipica (IGT) wines that are made outside DOC perimeters in certain regions. For most of its history, the grape has been viewed with suspicion as a "foreign influence" that distracts from the native grape varieties. After decades of experimentation, the general view of Cabernet Sauvignon has improved as more winemakers find ways to complement their native grape varieties with Cabernet as a blending component.

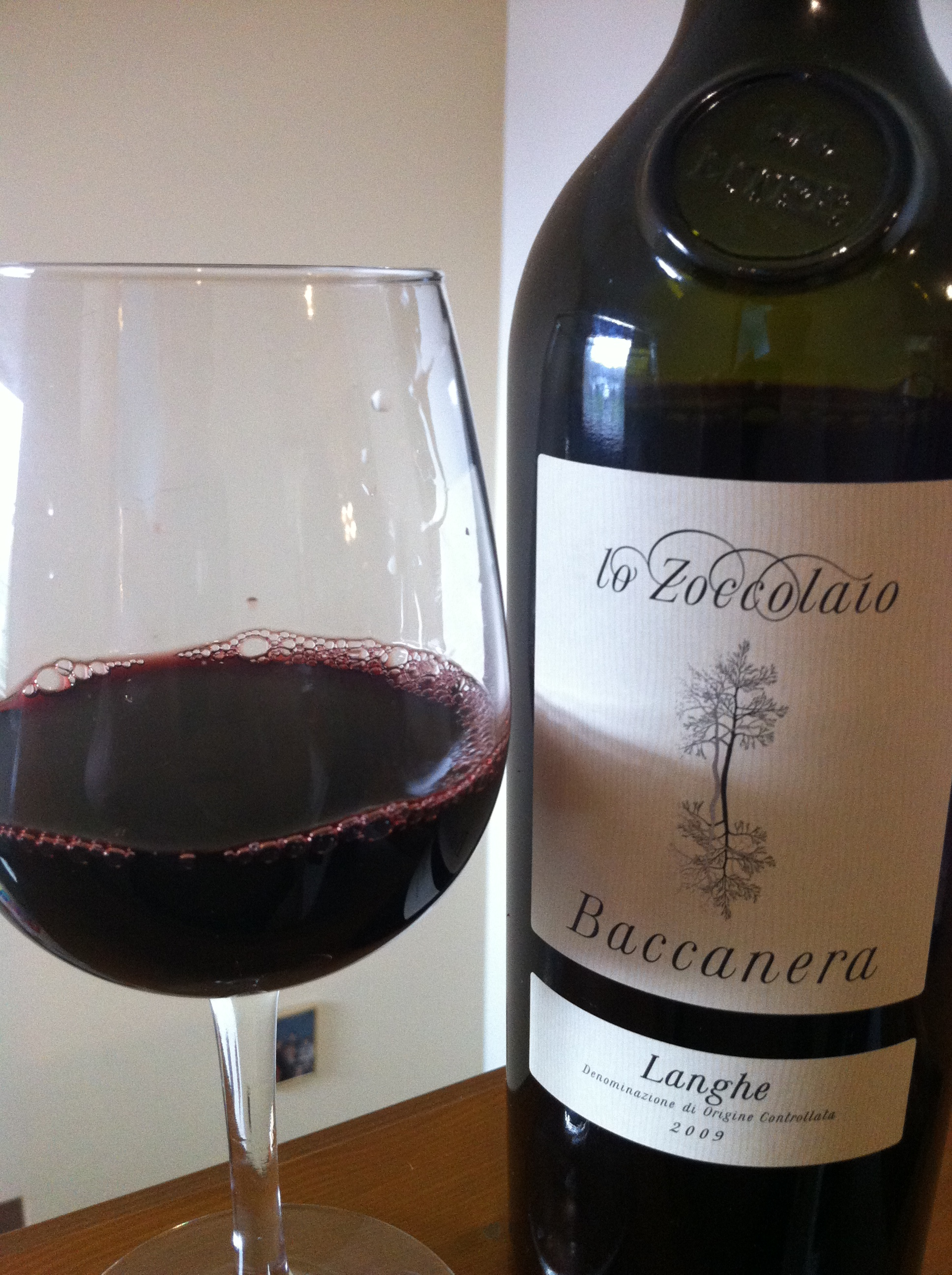
A Cabernet Sauvignon/Barbera blend from the Langhe DOC of Piedmont

In Piedmont, the grape was sometimes used as an "illegal" blending partner with Nebbiolo for DOC classified Barolo with the intention of adding colour and more fruit flavours. In the DOCs of Langhe and Monferrato, Cabernet is a permitted blending grape with Nebbiolo as well as Barbera. Wines composed of all three grape varieties are often subjected to considerable oak treatment to add a sense of sweet spiciness to compensate for the high tannins of Cabernet Sauvignon and Nebbiolo, the high acidity of Barbera. There are varietal styles of Cabernet Sauvignon produced in Piedmont, with qualities varying depending on the location. In other regions of northern Italy, such as Lombardy, Emilia-Romagna and Friuli-Venezia Giulia, the grape is often blended with Merlot to produce Bordeaux style blends. In the Veneto region, Cabernet Sauvignon is sometimes blended with the main grapes of Valpolicella-Corvina, Molinara and Rondinella. In southern Italy, the grape is mostly used as a blending component with local varieties-such as Carignan in Sardinia, Nero d'Avola in Sicily, Aglianico in Campania and Gaglioppo in Calabria.

Cabernet Sauvignon has had a controversial history in Tuscan wine, particularly for its role in the arrival of "Super Tuscan" in the mid-1970s. The origin of Super Tuscans is rooted in the restrictive DOC practices of the Chianti zone before the 1990s. During this time, Chianti could be composed of no more than 70% Sangiovese and had to include at least 10% of one of the local white wine grapes. Many Tuscan wine producers thought they could produce better quality wine if they were not hindered by the DOC regulations, particularly if they had the freedom to use Cabernet Sauvignon in the blend and were not required to use white grape varieties. The marchese Piero Antinori was one of the first to create a "Chianti-style" wine that ignored the DOC regulations, releasing a 1971 Sangiovese-Cabernet Sauvignon blend known as Tignanello in 1978. Other producers followed suit, and soon the prices for these Super Tuscans were consistently beating the prices of some of the most well-known Chianti. Other Tuscan wine regions followed suit, blending Cabernet Sauvignon with Sangiovese and even making varietal versions of the grape. Gradually the DOC system caught on and began allowing more regions to use the grape in their DOC-designated wines. Cabernet Sauvignon in Tuscany is characterized by ripe black cherry flavours that can give a perception of sweetness as well as strong notes of blackcurrant. The wines typically reach an alcohol level around 14% but can still maintain notable acidity levels. Cabernet Sauvignon can dominate the blend when blended with Sangiovese in significant quantities, with most Tuscan producers aiming to find a particular balance that suits their desired style.

=== Other Old World producers ===
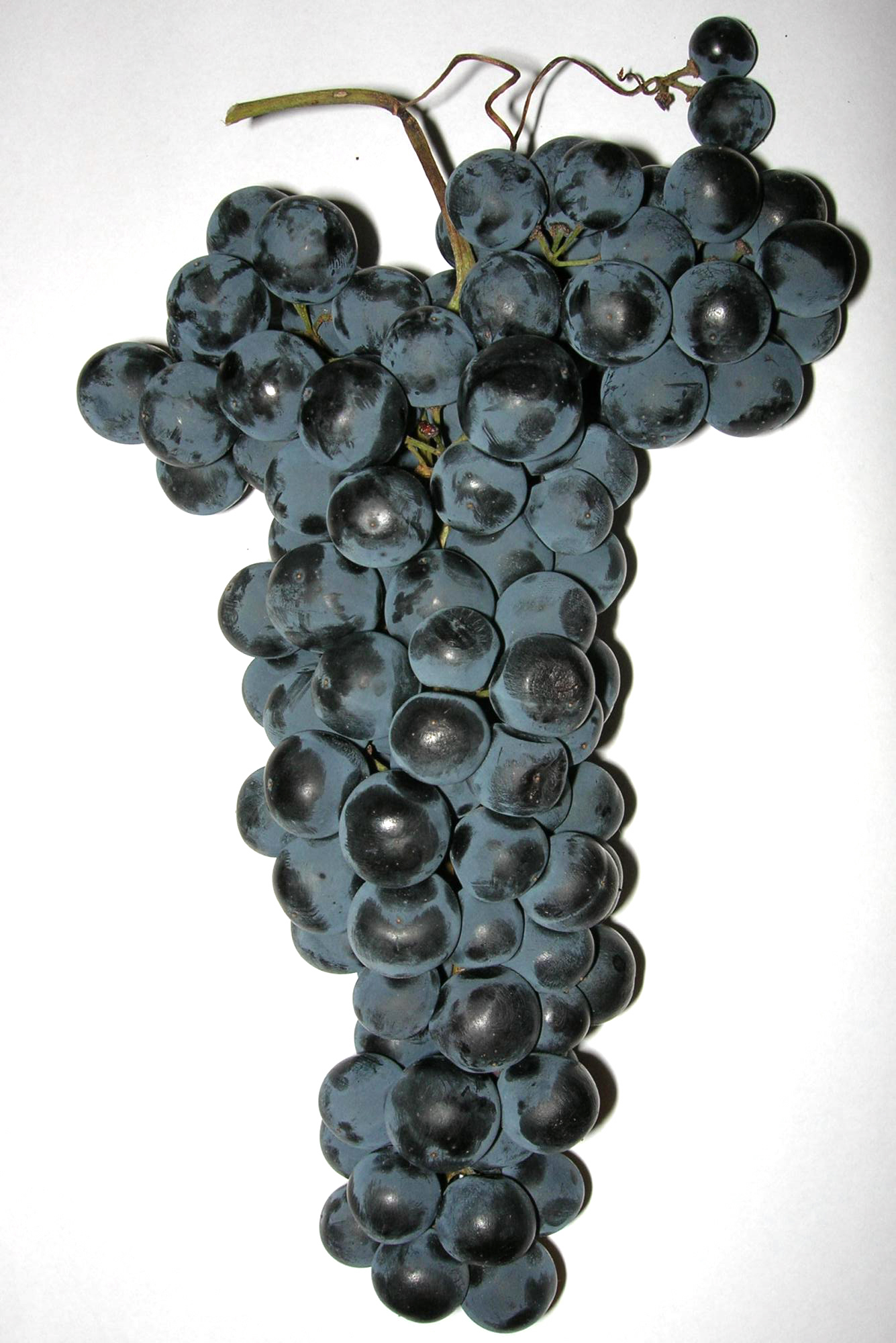
In Spain, Cabernet Sauvignon is often blended with Tempranillo.(pictured)

The introduction of Cabernet Sauvignon to Spain occurred in the Rioja region when the Marqués de Riscal planted cuttings from Bordeaux in the nineteenth century. It was not until the 1960s, however, before cultivation took off. By 2015, it was the sixth most widely planted red wine grape in Spain. Today it is permitted in about half of the Spanish DOPs (Denominación de Origen Protegida). The grape is most prominent in the Catalan wine region of Penedès, where its use was revived by the estates of Bodegas Torres and Jean León. There the grape is often blended with Tempranillo. It is also primarily a blending grape in the Ribera del Duero, but producers in Navarra have found some international acclaim for their varietal wines.

In the United Kingdom, English wine producers have experimented with growing the variety in plastic tunnels which can create a greenhouse effect and protect the grapes from the less-than-ideal climate of the wine region. While the grape is permitted to be planted in some German wine regions (such as the Mosel), the vineyard sites best suited for ripening Cabernet are generally already occupied with Riesling; many producers are ill-inclined to uproot the popular German variety in favour of Cabernet Sauvignon. In the 1980s, inexpensive Bulgarian Cabernet Sauvignon was highly touted for its value and helped to establish that country's wine industry and garner it more international presence in the wine market. The grape performs a similar function for many countries in Central Europe, including Czech Republic, Hungary, Slovenia, and Eastern Europe, including Moldova, Romania, Georgia, Turkey, Bulgaria and Ukraine. It can be found in the eastern Mediterranean wine regions of Cyprus, Greece, Israel and Lebanon.

=== California ===
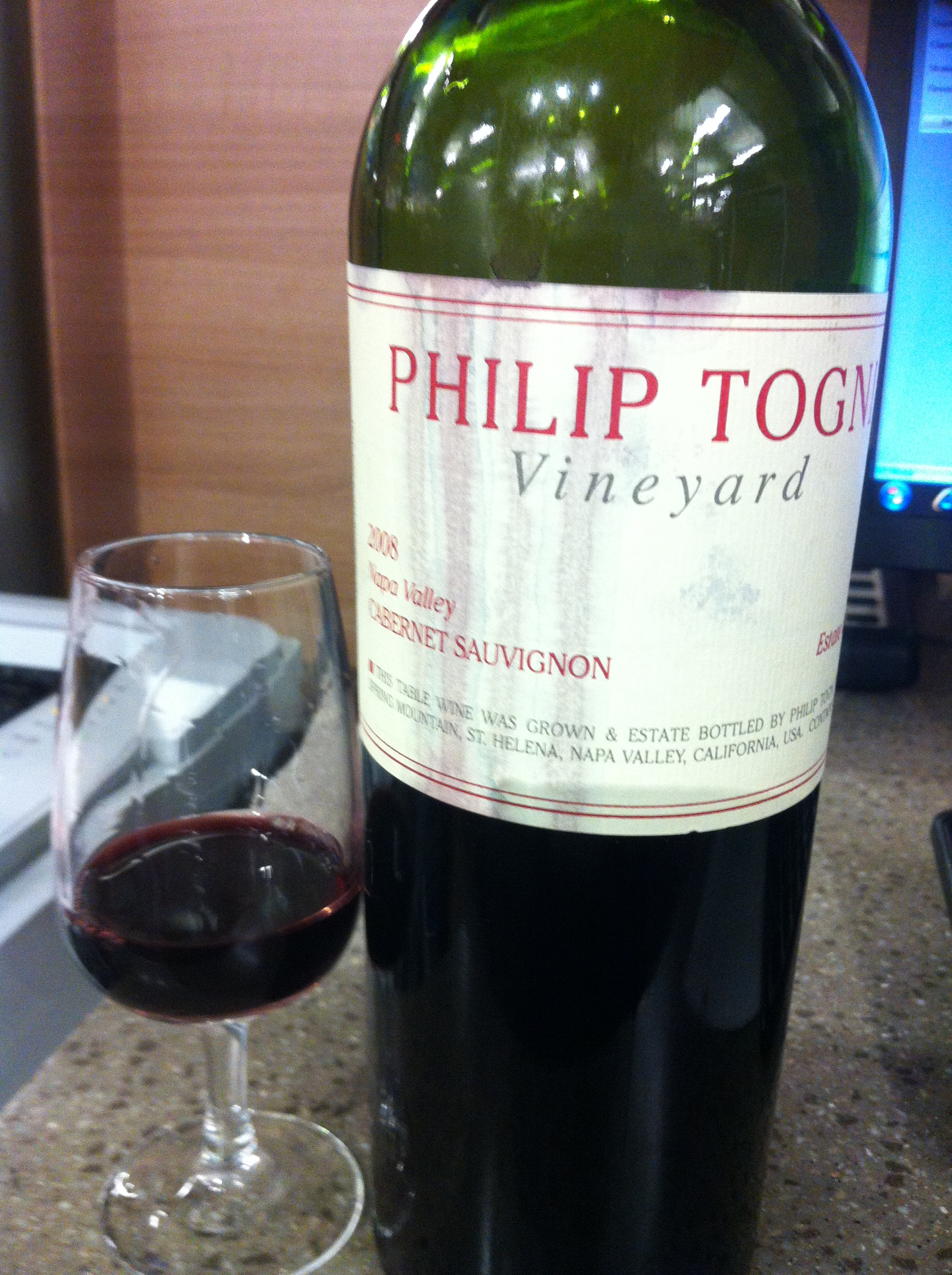
A Napa Valley Cabernet Sauvignon

In California, Cabernet Sauvignon has developed its characteristic style and reputation, which is recognizable in the world's market. Production and plantings of the grape in California are similar in quantity to those of Bordeaux. The 1976 Judgment of Paris wine tasting event helped to catapult Californian Cabernet Sauvignons onto the international stage when Stag's Leap Wine Cellars' 1973 Stags Leap District Cabernet Sauvignon beat out classified Bordeaux estates like Château Mouton Rothschild, Château Montrose, Château Haut-Brion and Château Léoville-Las Cases in a blind tasting conducted by French wine experts. In the 1980s, a new epidemic of phylloxera hit California, devastating many vineyards, which needed replanting. There was some speculation that ravaged Cabernet vineyards would be replanted with other varietals (such as those emerging from the Rhone Rangers movement), but in fact, California plantings of Cabernet Sauvignon doubled between 1988 and 1998; many wine regions— such as Napa Valley north of Yountville and Sonoma's Alexander Valley— were almost entirely dominated by the grape variety. It also started to gain a foothold in Dry Creek Valley, Sonoma Mountain and Mendocino County. Cabernet from Sonoma County has shown a tendency to feature anise and black olive notes while Napa County Cabernets are characterized by their strong black fruit flavours.

In California, the main stylistic difference in Cabernet Sauvignon is between hillside/mountain vineyards and those on flatter terrains like valley floors or some areas of the Central Valley. In Napa, the hillside vineyards of Diamond Mountain District, Howell Mountain, Mt. Veeder, Spring Mountain District have thinner, less fertile soils, which produce smaller berries with more intense flavours, reminiscent of Bordeaux wines that require years of ageing to mature. The yields are also much lower, typically in the range of 1–2 tons per acre in contrast to the 4–8 tons that can be produced in the more fertile valley floors. Wines produced from mountainside vineyards tend to be characterized by deep inky colours and strong berry aromas. Throughout California, many wine regions have the potential to grow Cabernet Sauvignon to full ripeness and produce fruity, full-bodied wines with alcohol levels regularly above the Bordeaux average of 12–13%—often in excess of 14%.

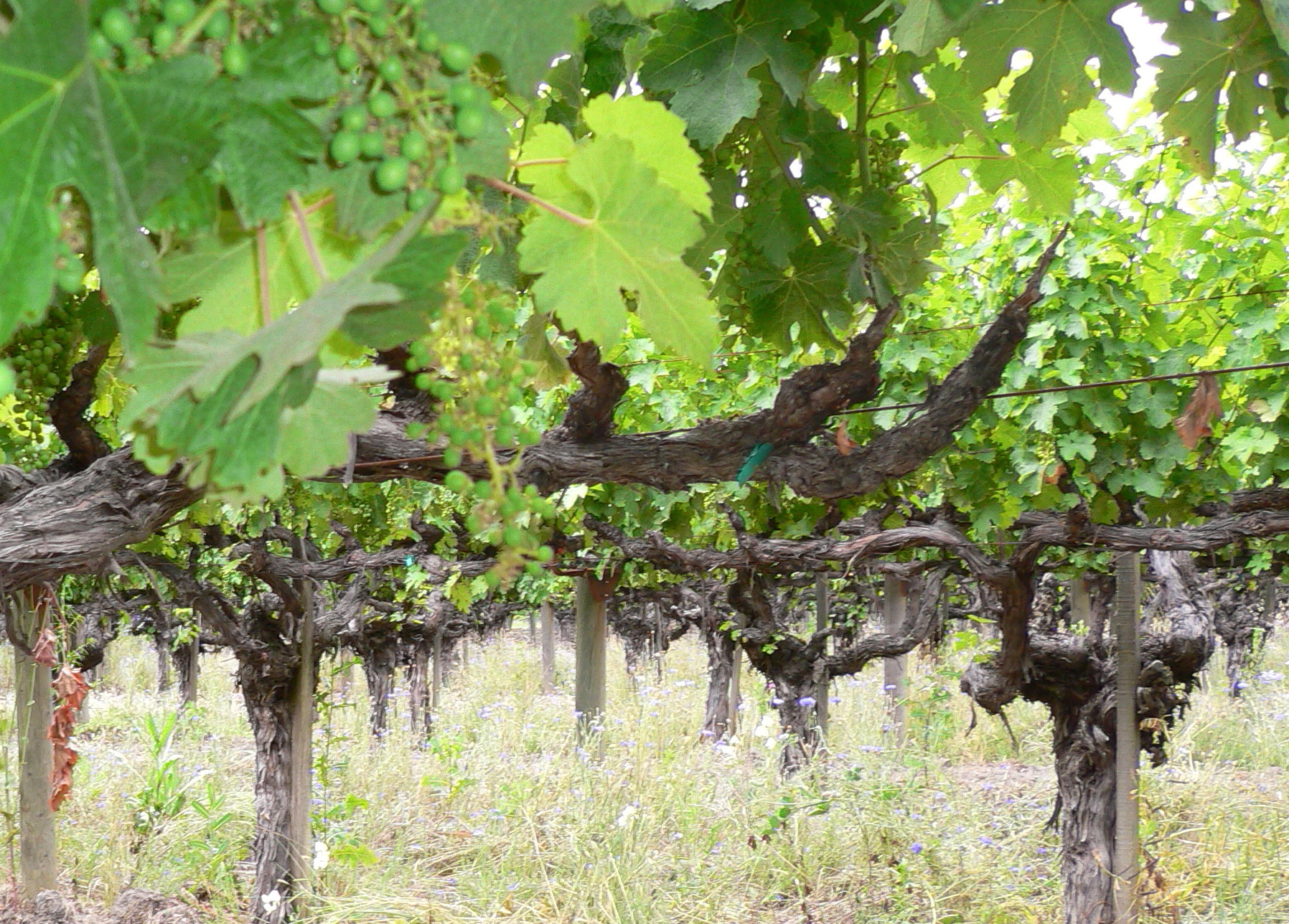
Old vine Cabernet Sauvignon at Chateau Montelena in Napa Valley. As the grapes mature, they will darken to a bluish-purple hue.

The use of oak in California Cabernet has a long history, with many producers favouring the use of new oak barrels heavily composed of American oak. After the early 1980s' unsuccessful trend to create more "food friendly" wines with less ripeness and less oak influence, winemakers' focus shifted back to oak influence. Still, producers were more inclined to limit and lighten the use of oak barrels, with many turning to French oak or a combination of new and older oak barrels.

=== Washington State ===
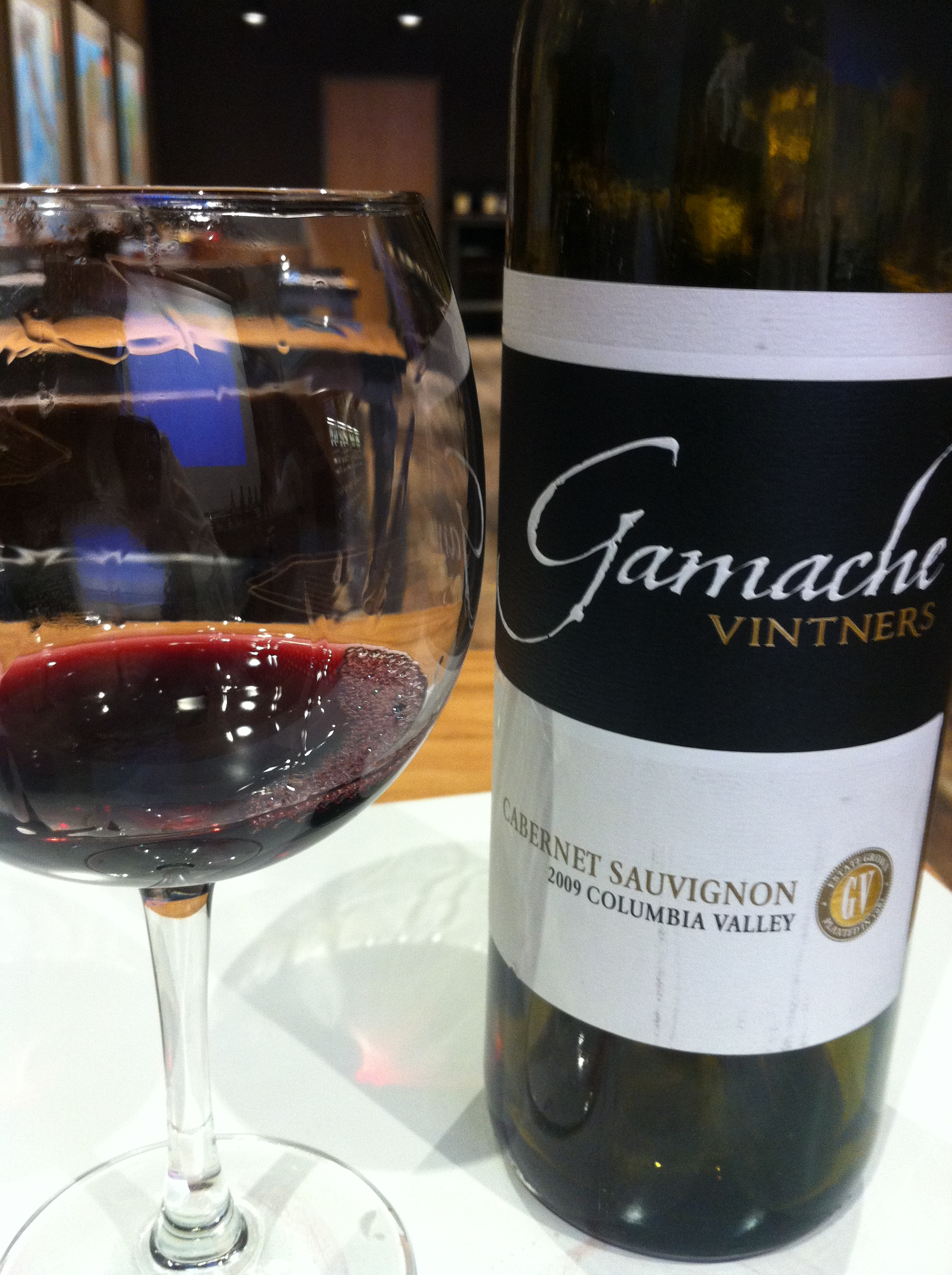
A Washington Cabernet Sauvignon from the Columbia Valley AVA

According to the Washington State Wine Commission, Cabernet Sauvignon is the most widely planted red grape variety in Washington state. It is generally found in the warmer sites of the Columbia Valley. The vines are choice plantings for growers due to their hardy vine stalks and resistance to the cold winter frost that is commonplace in Eastern Washington. Washington Cabernet Sauvignon is characterized by its fruitiness and easy drinking styles that are not overly tannic. Recent Washington American Viticultural Areas (AVAs) that have seen some success with their Cabernet Sauvignons include Red Mountain, Walla Walla Valley and parts of the Yakima Valley AVA near the Tri-Cities region.

==== Elsewhere in the United States ====
In Oregon, there are small quantities of Cabernet Sauvignon planted in the warmer southern regions of the Umpqua and Rogue Valleys.

It has also started to develop a presence in the Arizona, New York, Ohio, Texas and Virginia wine industries, particularly in the Texas Hill Country and North Fork of Long Island AVAs. Cabernet Sauvignon is made in varietal and blended styles throughout the United States. Under the American system, varietal Cabernet Sauvignon can include up to 25% other grapes.

=== South America ===
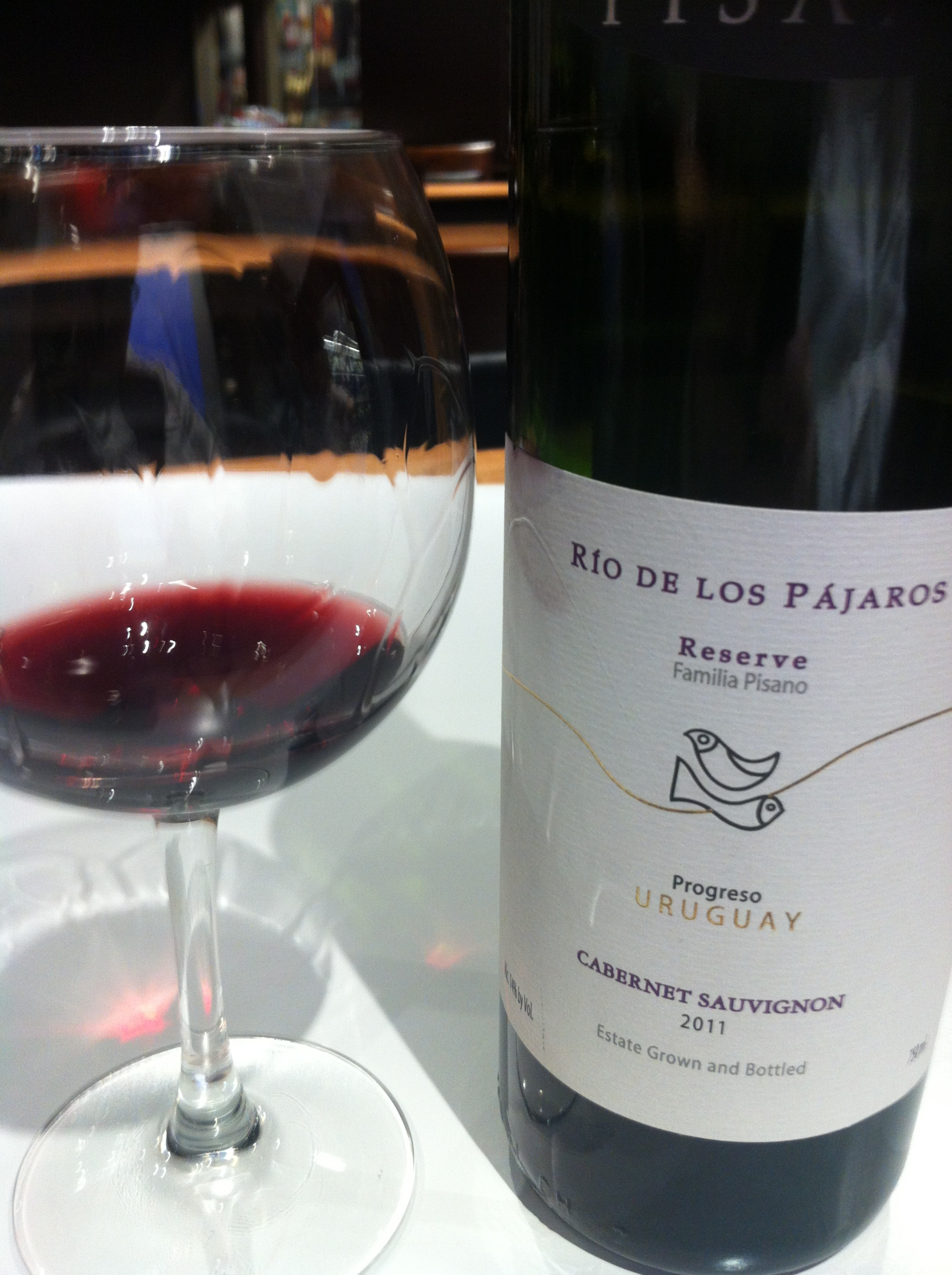
A Cabernet Sauvignon from Uruguay

Cabernet Sauvignon is grown in nearly every South American country, including Chile, Bolivia, Brazil, Peru and Uruguay. In Chile, the wines were historically limited by the excessively high yields commonplace throughout the country. As producers began to concentrate on limiting yields, regional differences that distinguished Chilean Cabernets began to emerge. For vineyard plantings along flat river valleys, the region's climate is the most important consideration; as plantings move to higher elevations and along hillsides, soil type is a more significant concern. The wines of the Aconcagua region are noted for their ripe fruit but closed, tight structure that needs some time in the bottle to develop. In the Maipo Valley, Cabernet Sauvignon wines are characterized by their pervasive blackcurrant fruit and an earthy, dusty note. In warmer regions, such as the Colchagua Province and around Curicó, the grapes ripen more fully; they produce wines with rich fruit flavours that can be perceived as sweet due to the ripeness of the fruit. The acidity levels of these wines will be lower, and the tannins will also be softer, making the wines more approachable at a younger age.

=== Argentina ===
In Argentina, Cabernet Sauvignon lags behind Malbec as the country's main red grape, but its numbers are growing. The varietal versions often have lighter fruit flavours and are meant to be consumed young. Premium examples are often blended with Malbec and produce full, tannic wines with leather and tobacco notes. In recent years, there have been increased plantings of Cabernet Sauvignon in the Uco Valley of the Mendoza Province; the wines coming from vineyards planted at higher altitudes garner some international attention.

=== Australia ===
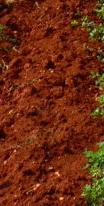
Unlike other clay-based soils, the free-draining terra rosa of Australia's Coonawarra region contributes to a unique style of Cabernet Sauvignon.

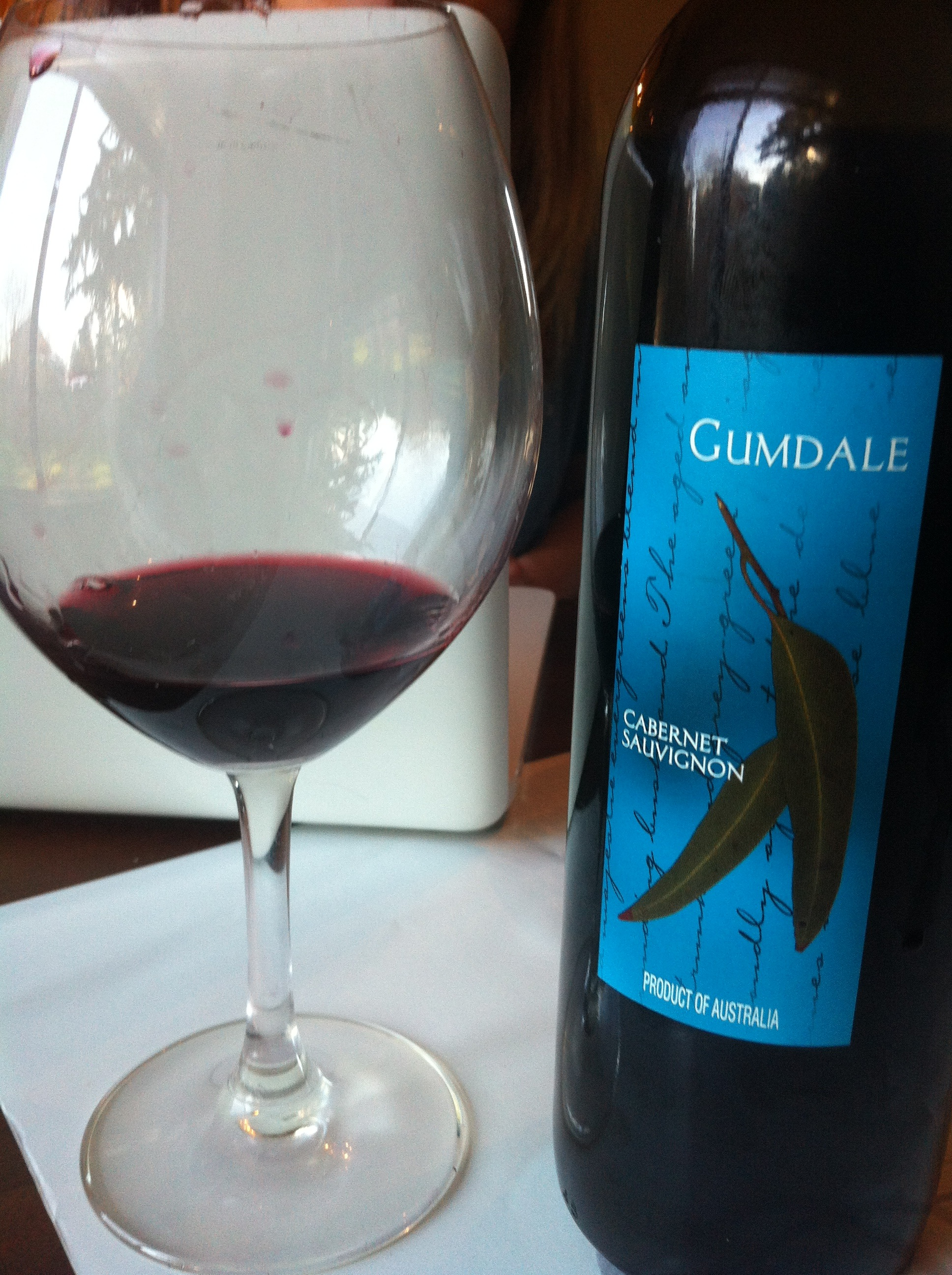
An Australian Cabernet Sauvignon

In the 1970s, the Coonawarra region first brought international attention to Australian Cabernet Sauvignons with intense fruit flavours and subtle minty notes. The Margaret River region soon followed with tightly structured wines with pronounced black fruit notes. In the 1980s, Australia followed California's contemporary trend in producing lighter, more "food friendly" wines with alcohol levels around 11-12% percent; by the early 1990s, the styles changed again to focus on balance and riper fruit flavours. Today Cabernet Sauvignon is the second most widely planted red wine grape in Australia, following Shiraz, with which it is often blended. It can be found in several wine regions, with many large producers using grapes from several states. Notable regional differences characterize Australian Cabernet Sauvignon: in addition to the wine styles of Coonawarra and Margaret River, the Barossa Valley produces big, full-bodied wines while the nearby, cooler Clare Valley produces wines with more concentrated fruit, and wines of the Victorian wine region of the Yarra Valley are noted for their balance in acidity, tannins and fruit flavours.

=== Other New World producers ===
Since the end of apartheid, the South African wine industry has been working to reestablish itself in the world's wine markets, with many regions actively promoting their Cabernet Sauvignon. Today it is the most widely planted red wine grape in South Africa. It is produced in varietal and blended styles; some producers favour a Bordeaux blend, while others follow the Australian example of blending with Syrah. Early examples of South African Cabernet Sauvignon were produced by grapes planted in vineyard locations that were cooler than ideal, creating very herbaceous wines with the distinctive "green bell pepper" notes. In the mid-1990s, there was more emphasis on harvesting at fuller ripeness, and new clones were introduced that produced riper, sweeter fruit. As the vines age and better vineyards locations are identified, regional styles are starting to emerge among South African Cabernet Sauvignons: the Stellenbosch region is noted for heavy, full-bodied wines while Constantia's wines are characterized by their herbal and minty flavours.

In New Zealand, the climate has been a challenge in finding wine regions suitable for producing Cabernet Sauvignon. Most of the industry focus has centred on the North Island. The Hawkes Bay region was the first to make a significant effort in producing Cabernet Sauvignon, but the region's cool climate, coupled with the high yields and fertile alluvial soils, produced wines that were still marked with aggressive green and vegetal flavours. Added focus on canopy management, which gives the grapes more sunlight to ripen by removing excess foliage, and low vigour rootstock and pruning combine to achieve lower yields and have started to produce better results. The grape is sometimes blended with Merlot to help compensate for climate and terroir. Other regions in New Zealand have sprung up with a renewed focus on producing distinctive New Zealand Cabernet Sauvignon: The Gimblett Road and Havelock North regions of Hawkes Bay, with their warm gravel soils, have started to achieve notice as well as Waiheke Island near Auckland. Overall the grape lags far behind Pinot noir in New Zealand's red wine grape plantings.

Canada produces cabernet sauvignon varietals and "Bordeaux blends", and some of its cabernet sauvignon is used to create ice wine.

=== China ===
The first vintage produced by Emma Gao at Silver Heights Winery in Ningxia was praised by Chinese and international winemakers, and two of her red wines are among the best-known produced in China. They are a Cabernet Sauvignon 'Emma's Reserve' and a Bordeaux blend 'The Summit'.

== Popularity and criticism ==
In the past century, Cabernet Sauvignon has enjoyed a swell of popularity as one of the noble grapes in the world of wine. Built partially on its historical success in Bordeaux and New World wine regions like California and Australia, planting the grape is considered a solid choice in any wine region that is warm enough to cultivate it. Among consumers, Cabernet has become a familiar wine which has aided in its accessibility and appeals even from obscure wine regions and producers. In the 1980s, the Bulgarian wine industry was largely driven and introduced to the international wine market by the success of its Cabernet Sauvignon wines. The widespread popularity of Bordeaux has contributed to criticism of the grape variety for its role as a "colonizer" grape, being planted in new and emerging wine regions at the expense of focus on the unique local grape varieties. Some regions, such as Portugal, with its abundance of native grape varieties, have largely ignored Cabernet Sauvignon as it seeks to rejuvenate its wine industry beyond Port production.

== Wine styles ==
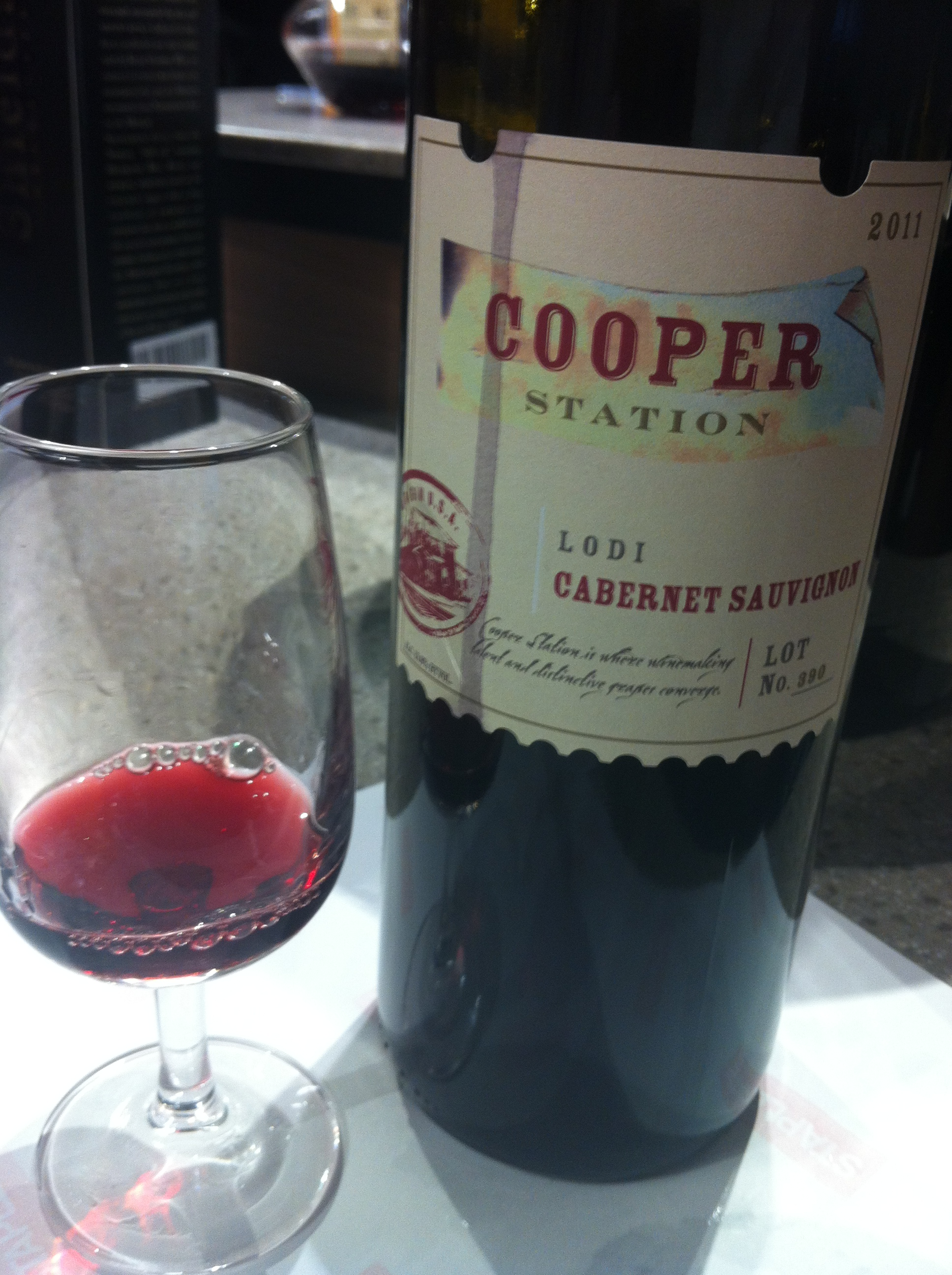
New World Cabernet Sauvignons, such as this one from California's Lodi region, often have more pronounced, ripe fruit flavors than Old World wines from regions like Bordeaux.

The grapes' ripeness strongly influences Cabernet Sauvignon's style at harvest. When more on the unripe side, the grapes are high in pyrazines and will exhibit pronounced green bell peppers and vegetal flavours. When harvested overripe, the wines can taste jammy and may have aromas of stewed blackcurrants. Some winemakers choose to harvest their grapes at different ripeness levels in order to incorporate these different elements and potentially add some layer of complexity to the wine. When Cabernet Sauvignon is young, the wines typically exhibit strong fruit flavours of black cherries and plum. The aroma of blackcurrants is one of the most distinctive and characteristic elements of Cabernet Sauvignon that is present in virtually every style of wine across the globe. Styles from various regions and producers may also have eucalyptus, mint and tobacco aromas. As the wines age, they can sometimes develop aromas associated with cedar, cigar boxes and pencil shavings. New World examples generally have more pronounced fruity notes, while Old World wines can be more austere with heightened earthy notes.

=== Ability to age ===
In the 19th and 20th centuries, Cabernet Sauvignon's reputation was built on its ability to age and develop in the bottle. In addition to softening some of their austere tannins, as Cabernet wines age, new flavours and aromas can emerge and add to the wines' complexity. Historically this was a trait characterized by Bordeaux, with some premium examples in favourable vintages having the potential to last for over a century, but producers across the globe have developed styles that could age and develop for several decades. Even with the ability to age, some Cabernet Sauvignon wines can still be approachable a few years after the vintage. In Bordeaux, the tannins of the wines tend to soften after ten years and can typically last for at least another, decade-sometimes longer, depending on the producer and vintage. Some Spanish and Italian Cabernet Sauvignons will need similar time as Bordeaux to develop, but most examples are typically made to be drunk earlier.

While New World Cabernets are considered drinkable earlier than Bordeaux, premium producers such as the Californian cult wines will produce wines that need time to age and could potentially develop for two to three decades. Overall, the majority of Californian Cabernets are meant to be approachable after only a couple of years in the bottle but can still have the potential to improve further over time. Similarly, many premium Australian cabernets will also need at least ten years to develop though many are approachable after two to five years. New Zealand wines are typically meant to be consumed young and will often maintain their green herbal flavours even with extended bottle ageing. South American Cabernets have very pronounced fruit flavours when they are young, and the best-made examples will keep some of those flavours as they age. South African wines tend to favour more Old World styles and typically require six to eight years of ageing before developing further flavours.

== Pairing with food ==
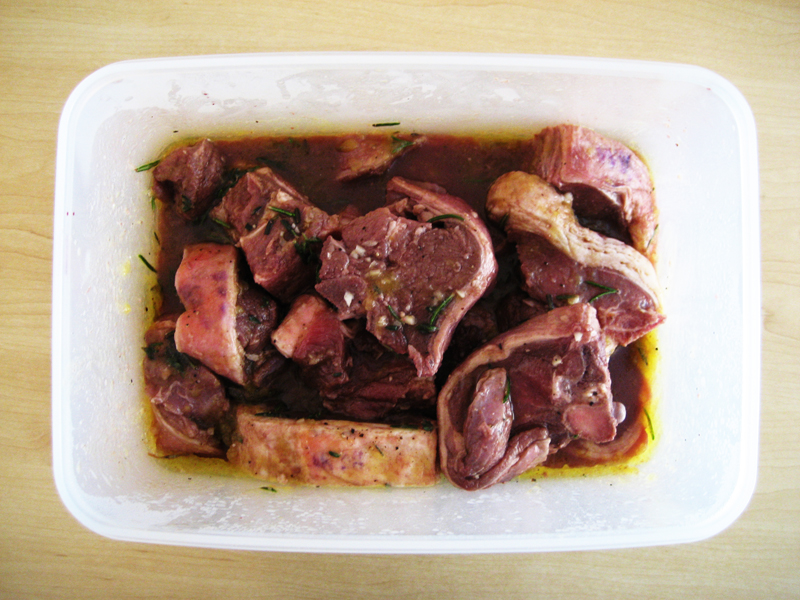
Fatty red meats, such as lamb, pair well with Cabernet Sauvignon due to the ability of proteins and fats to negate some of the tannic qualities of the wine.

Cabernet Sauvignon is a very bold and assertive wine that has the potential to overwhelm light and delicate dishes. The wine's high tannin content, oak influences, and high alcohol levels associated with many regional styles play important roles in influencing how well the wine matches different foods. When Cabernet Sauvignon is young, all those elements are at their peak, but as the wine ages, it mellows; possibilities for different food pairings open up. In most circumstances, matching the weight (alcohol level and body) of the wine to the heaviness of the food is an important consideration. Cabernet Sauvignons with high alcohol levels do not pair well with spicy foods due to hotness levels of the capsaicins present in spices like chili peppers being enhanced by the alcohol with the heat accentuating the bitterness of the tannins. Milder spices, such as black pepper, pair better due to their ability to minimize the perception of tannins—such as in the classic pairings of Cabernet Sauvignon with steak au poivre and pepper-crusted ahi tuna.

Fats and proteins reduce the perception of tannins on the palate. When Cabernet Sauvignon is paired with steak or dishes with a heavy butter cream sauce, the tannins are neutralized, allowing the fruits of the wine to be more noticeable. In contrast, starches such as pastas and rice will have little effect on tannins. The bitterness of the tannins can also be counterbalanced by the use of bitter foods, such as radicchio and endive, or with cooking methods that involve charring like grilling. As the wine ages and the tannins lessen, more subtle and less bitter dishes will pair better with Cabernet Sauvignon. The oak influences of the wine can be matched with cooking methods that have similar influences on the food—such as grilling, smoking and plank roasting. Dishes that include oak-influenced flavours and aromas typically found in Cabernet Sauvignon—such as dill weed, brown sugar, nutmeg and vanilla—can also pair well.

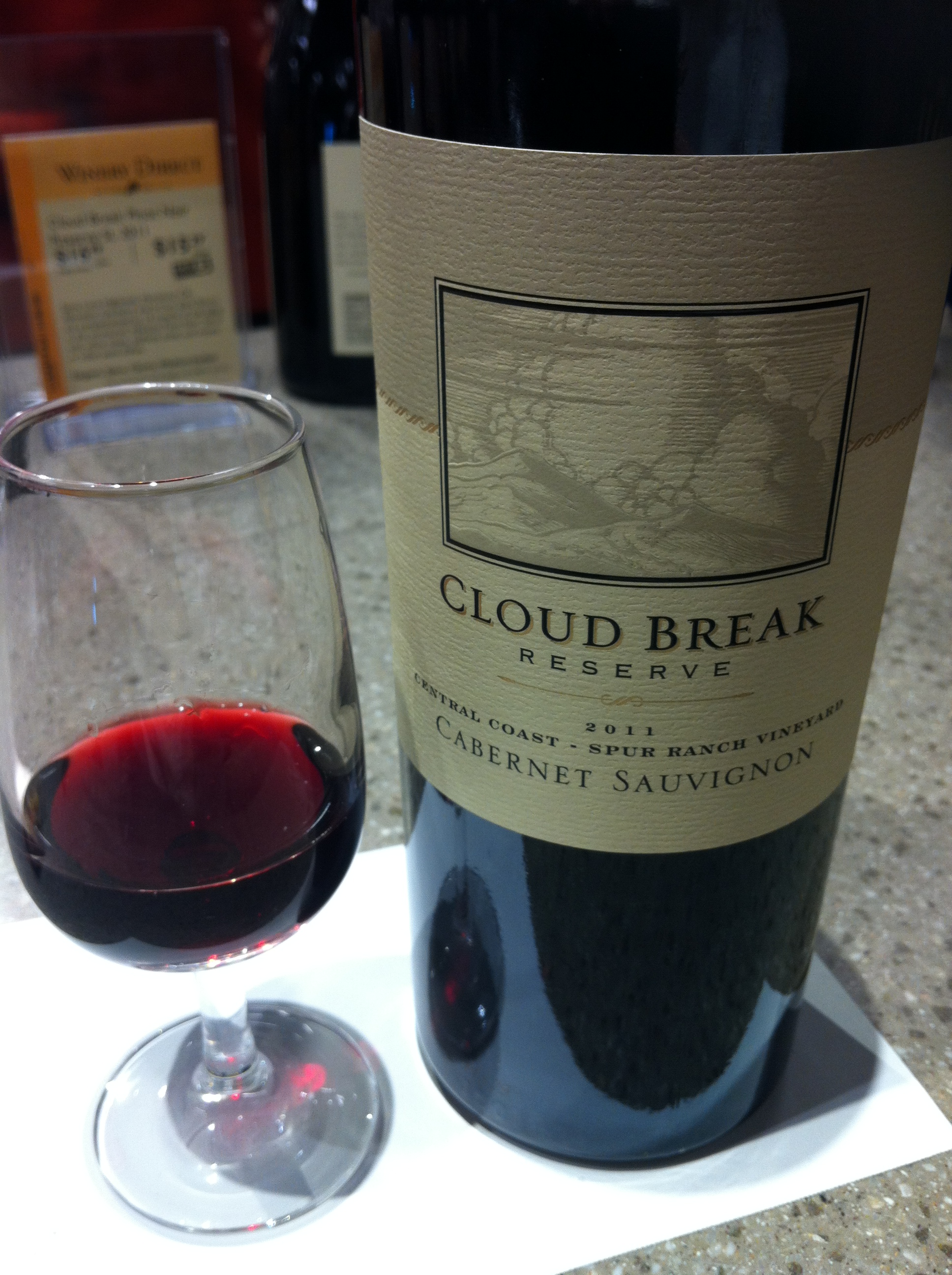
A Californian Cabernet Sauvignon from the Central Coast AVA

The different styles of Cabernet Sauvignon from other regions can also influence how well the wine matches up with certain foods. Old World wines like Bordeaux have earthier influences and will pair better with mushrooms. Wines from cooler climates that have noticeable vegetal notes can be balanced with vegetables and greens. New World wines, with bolder fruit flavours that may even be perceived as sweet, will pair well with bolder dishes that have lots of different flavour influences. While Cabernet Sauvignon has the potential to pair well with bitter dark chocolate, it will not pair well with sweeter styles such as milk chocolate. The wine can typically pair well with a variety of cheeses, such as Cheddar, mozzarella and Brie, but full-flavoured or blue cheeses will typically compete too much with the flavours of Cabernet Sauvignon to be a complementary pairing.

== Health benefits ==
In late 2006, the Federation of American Societies for Experimental Biology published the result of studies conducted at the Icahn School of Medicine at Mount Sinai that showed the beneficial relationship of resveratrol, a compound found in all red wine, in reducing the risk factors associated with Alzheimer's disease. The study showed that resveratrol found in Cabernet Sauvignon could reduce levels of amyloid beta peptides, which attack brain cells and are part of the etiology of Alzheimer's. Resveratrol has also been shown to promote the clearance of amyloid-beta peptides. It has also been shown that non-alcoholic extracts of Cabernet Sauvignon protect hypertensive rats during ischaemia and reperfusion.

== See also ==
- International variety
