= Eutypella parasitica =

Scientific classification
- Domain: Eukaryota
- Kingdom: Fungi
- Division: Ascomycota
- Class: Sordariomycetes
- Order: Xylariales
- Family: Diatrypaceae
- Genus: Eutypella
- Species: E. parasitica

Binomial name
- Eutypella parasitica R.W. Davidson & R.C. Lorenz (1938)

Species of fungus

Eutypella canker is a plant disease caused by the fungal pathogen Eutypella parasitica. This disease is capable of infecting many species of maple trees and produces a large, distinguishable canker on the main trunk of the tree. Infection and spread of the disease is accomplished with the release of ascospores from perithecia. Therefore, the best way to manage the Eutypella canker is to remove trees that have been infected. If infected, it can decrease the quality of wood cut for lumber and can thus have a negative economic impact.

== Hosts and symptoms ==
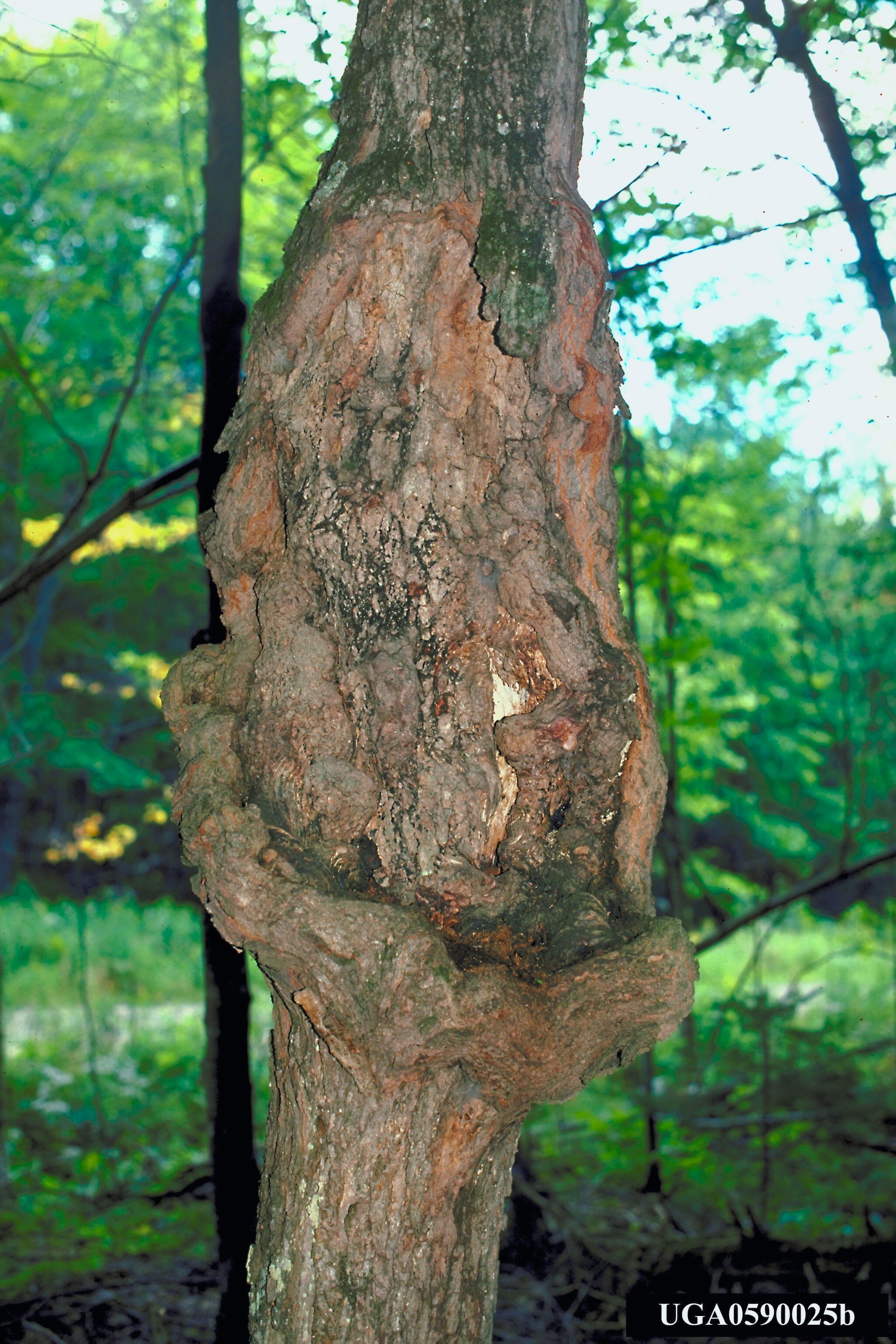
Canker: symptom produced by the pathogen

Eutypella canker infects many species of maple trees, most prevalently the sugar maple (Acer saccharum). Others commonly affected are the red maple (Acer rubrum), box elder (Acer negundo), striped maple (Acer pensylvanicum), Norway maple (Acer platanoides), sycamore maple (Acer pseudoplatanus), silver maple (Acer saccharinum), and black maple (Acer nigrum). Onset usually occurs with greater probability of younger maples since they are more susceptible.

Symptoms are similar to all species of maple and include a canker forming most commonly 2–12 feet (0.61–3.66 m) from the ground. The formation of the canker begins with a small pronounced necrosis of the bark and requires several years to expand. The canker enlarges as the tree ages by increasing its width and forming ringed callus around it. It is then capable of surrounding over half the trunk with a typical diameter of 0.3–2.5 m (1 ft 0 in – 8 ft 2 in). Although the canker can become quite large, it normally does not kill the tree but does increase the risk of the trunk failing and being blown over by the wind. As for visible signs of the fungus, if the bark is peeled back at the center of the canker, a mat of white mycelium (fungal tissue) will be revealed.

== Disease cycle ==
Eutypella parasitica is characterized as an ascomycete fungus that produces fruiting bodies called perithecia. When conditions are favorable (moderate temperature and high humidity), the perithecium will produce sexual spores called ascospores which are dispersed primarily by the wind. If they land on the susceptible host they may enter through a wound and establish themselves in the xylem tissue of the host. Each year, the fungus kills the callus material formed by the tree and invades more cambium during the growing season. During the summer months, the fungus is also able to produce asexual spores called conidia that are dispersed by the wind to be used as secondary inoculum to infect other maple trees in the area. Upon dispersal, they potentially land on a susceptible host which induces the spore to germinate and produce mycelia. At the end of the season, the fungus produces perithecia. Then, the fungus can overwinter as perithecia or as mycelia in the host. Due to the slow development of the disease, these fruiting bodies are not produced until 5–8 years after initial infection. Once they are produced they can be visible with very close observation in the center of the canker, which can give it a speckled, gritty appearance.

== Environment ==
The main factors that contribute to the release of the ascospores are moisture and temperature. For the most part, as long as temperatures are above freezing spores can be released, but they are most likely to be released at moderate temperatures of 4–36 °C (39–97 °F). In the case of moisture, humidity alone is not enough to make the perithecia release the spores, as the perithecia themselves need to be wet. The temperate climates of North America and Europe are most conducive for Eutypella canker development.

== Management ==
The best way to lower infection is to control the probability of infection in the trees. Trees that are infected need to be cut down and removed optimally on a dry day, as do seedlings and saplings that are also found to be infected. This is done to eliminate the source of the inoculum that can infect other trees. If a tree has cankered branches, the infected branches need to be cut off close to the trunk without damaging the trunk. Cutting the branches flush to the trunk gets rid of the infected branches and also reduces the risk of infection since the tree can heal from this wound more easily. To ensure that the disease is eliminated and not going to spread elsewhere the removed branches and trees should be burned.

== Importance ==
Maple trees with Eutypella canker have a reduction in quality due to the deformity of the trunk. Therefore, if used for lumber products the cankered area will be wasted wood. This disease can then cause reduced economical value of lumber in areas of high infection. Also, aesthetics of the tree is diminished due to the symptoms of the pathogen. Although it can decrease the quality of the tree, the incidence is usually quite low. Infection rates are typically 2%–10% in a particular stand, but it has been recorded to infect over 20%.
