= Chinese coronavirus =

Chinese coronavirus may refer to:

- Severe acute respiratory syndrome coronavirus (SARS-CoV), first reported in Foshan, Guangdong, China; in November 2002
  - 2002–2004 SARS outbreak
- Severe acute respiratory syndrome coronavirus 2 (SARS-CoV-2), first reported in Wuhan, Hubei, China; in December 2019
  - COVID-19 pandemic in China
    - COVID-19 pandemic in mainland China
      - Sometimes associated with xenophobia related to the COVID-19 pandemic

== See also ==
- Novel coronavirus (nCoV)
- Coronavirus (CoV)
- Coronaviridae
- Coronavirus diseases
- COVID-19
- Coronavirus#Outbreaks
- Chinese virus (disambiguation)
