= Château d'Armailhac =

Winery in Pauillac, Bordeaux, France

Coordinates: 45.2111°N 0.7700°W

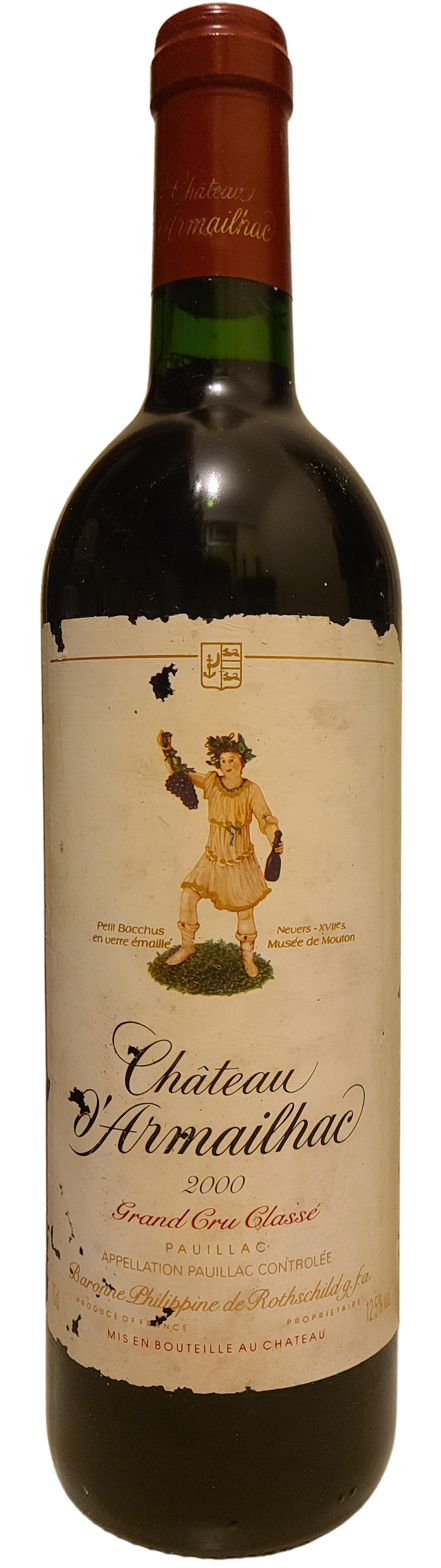
Grand Vin 2000

Château d'Armailhac (French pronunciation: [ʃato daʁmelak]), previously named Château Mouton-d'Armailhacq (historical name from inception, 1750–1955), Château Mouton-Baron Philippe, Mouton Baronne and Château Mouton-Baronne-Philippe (1979–1988), is a winery in the Pauillac appellation of the Bordeaux region of France. The wine produced here was classified as one of eighteen Cinquièmes Crus (Fifth Growths) in the Bordeaux Wine Official Classification of 1855. In 1989, Baroness Philippine decided to restore its original identity to Mouton d’Armailhacq, giving it the name Château d’Armailhac.

== The terroir ==
The Chateau has about 172 acres (70 hectares) planted with Cabernet Sauvignon (56%), Merlot (32%), Cabernet Franc (10%), and Petit Verdot (2%). Purchased by Baron Philippe de Rothschild in 1933, the estate is currently owned by the Mouton Rothschild branch of the Rothschild family.

Château d'Armailhac is among the first estates known to have actively grown Cabernet Sauvignon and is a likely source of Cabernet vines for other estates.

== Gallery ==
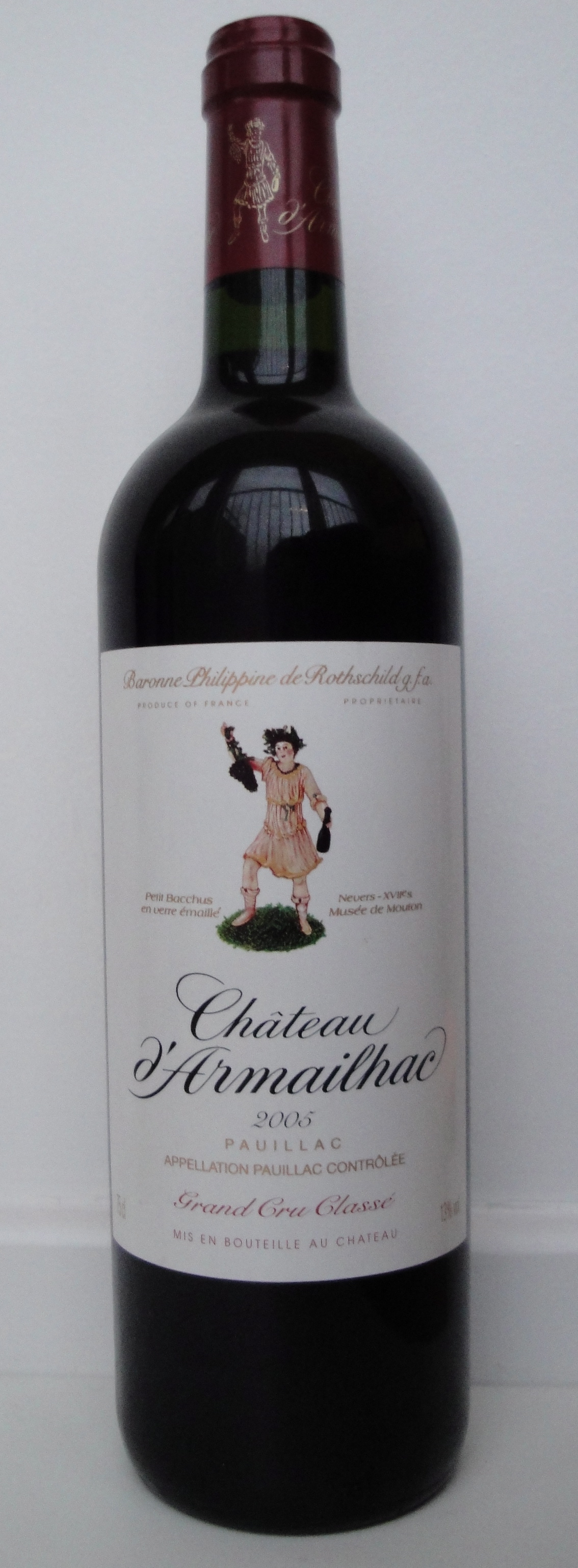
Grand Vin 2005

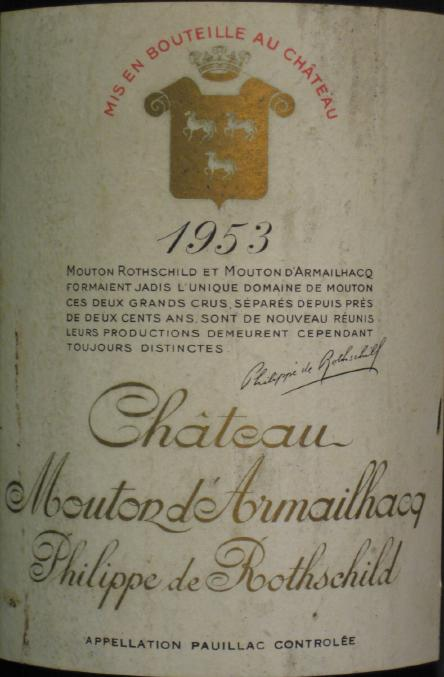
Detail of a label of then named Château Mouton d'Armailhacq Philippe de Rothschild of the 1953 vintage
