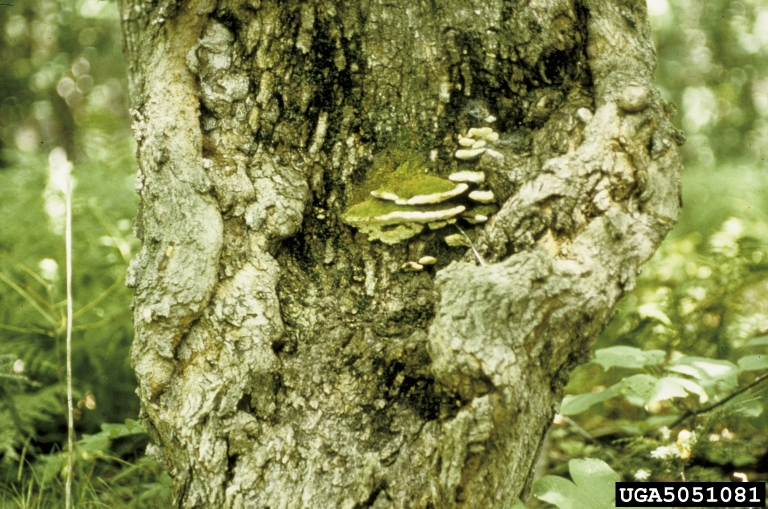
- Oxyporus populinus fruiting bodies, see original photo

Scientific classification
- Domain: Eukaryota
- Kingdom: Fungi
- Division: Ascomycota
- Class: Sordariomycetes
- Order: Xylariales
- Family: Diatrypaceae
- Genus: Eutypella (Nitschke) Sacc.

Type species
- Eutypella cerviculata (Fr.) Sacc.

Species
- Species includes: Eutypella parasitica; Eutypella scoparia

= Eutypella =

Genus of fungi

Eutypella is a genus of fungi in the family Diatrypaceae.

The fungi Eutypella sp. contains hexahydrobenzopyrans such as libertellenone which has been studied for its antibacterial and antiviral properties.

== Species ==
- Eutypella parasitica
- Eutypella quaternata
- Eutypella scoparia
- Eutypella sorbi
- Eutypella stellulata
