= Tomato leaf curl China virus =

Virus classification
- (unranked): Virus
- Realm: Monodnaviria
- Kingdom: Shotokuvirae
- Phylum: Cressdnaviricota
- Class: Repensiviricetes
- Order: Geplafuvirales
- Family: Geminiviridae
- Genus: Begomovirus
- Species: Begomovirus solanumchinaense

Species of virus

Tomato leaf curl China virus is a virus that infects tomato plants in China and was first described in 2011. The virus infects tomatoes in the Chinese province of Guangxi, and it is transmitted by the whitefly. The current EPPO name is TOLCCV, but its original name in the literature was ToLCCNV.

It belongs to the genus Begomovirus, which also contains Tomato yellow leaf curl China virus.
