= Eutypella scoparia =

Scientific classification
- Domain: Eukaryota
- Kingdom: Fungi
- Division: Ascomycota
- Class: Sordariomycetes
- Order: Xylariales
- Family: Diatrypaceae
- Genus: Eutypella
- Species: E. scoparia

Binomial name
- Eutypella scoparia (Schwein.) Ellis & Everh., (1892)

Synonyms
- Diatrype hystrix Fr., (1823); Eutypa heteracantha (Sacc.) Sacc., (1882); Eutypa scoparia (Schwein.) L.C. Tiffany & J.C. Gilman, (1965); Peroneutypa heteracantha (Sacc.) Berl., (1902); Peroneutypella scoparia (Schwein.) Berl., (1902); Sphaeria scoparia Schwein., (1822); Valsa ceratophora sensu Cooke; (1985); Valsa heteracantha Sacc., (1873); Valsa scoparia (Schwein.) M.A. Curtis

Species of fungus

Eutypella scoparia is a plant pathogen that causes Eutypa dieback on pecan.
