= Begomovirus solanumflavuschinaense =

Tomato yellow leaf curl China virus

Virus classification
- (unranked): Virus
- Realm: Monodnaviria
- Kingdom: Shotokuvirae
- Phylum: Cressdnaviricota
- Class: Repensiviricetes
- Order: Geplafuvirales
- Family: Geminiviridae
- Genus: Begomovirus
- Species: Begomovirus solanumflavuschinaense

Species of virus

Begomovirus solanumflavuschinaense, formerly Tomato yellow leaf curl China virus (TYLCCNV), is a virus which contains 25 isolates. It infects plants as different as tobacco and tomato, as well as genetically modified plants. Petunias can be infected, but show no symptoms. The microbiology of the virus has been studied in the Chinese province of Yunnan. Tomato yellow leaf curl China virus belongs to the genus Begomovirus, which also contains Tomato leaf curl China virus.

The Begomovirus solanumflavuschinaense DNA sequence contains 2734 nucleotides and is transmitted by the whitefly Bemisia tabaci.

== History ==
In 2007, it was reported for the first time ever that Begomovirus solanumflavuschinaense now infects the kidney bean in China.

In 2019, it emerged that Begomovirus solanumflavuschinaense impairs photosynthesis in certain infected plants.
