= BCTV =

BCTV may refer to:

- Beet curly top virus, a pathogen of a variety of garden plants
- Beijing Cable Television, merged into BTV in July 2001
- Berks Community Television in Berks County, Pennsylvania
- Boston Catholic Television, now CatholicTV
- Boston College Television at Boston College
- BCTV or British Columbia Television, now CHAN-DT
- Business Channel Television, now Kompas TV East Java
