= Yamatotettix flavovittatus =

Scientific classification
- Kingdom: Animalia
- Phylum: Arthropoda
- Class: Insecta
- Order: Hemiptera
- Suborder: Auchenorrhyncha
- Family: Cicadellidae
- Subfamily: Deltocephalinae
- Tribe: Macrostelini
- Genus: Yamatotettix
- Species: Y. flavovittatus

Binomial name
- Yamatotettix flavovittatus Matsumura, 1914

Genus of insects

Yamatotettix flavovittatus is a species of leafhopper, first described in 1914 by Shōnen Matsumura, from specimens collected on Honshu, and Formosa.

This species is found on the Korean Peninsula, in Japan, China, Papua New Guinea, Indonesia, Taiwan, Thailand, Myanmar, Laos, and Malaysia.
