= Curtovirus =

Virus classification
- (unranked): Virus
- Realm: Monodnaviria
- Kingdom: Shotokuvirae
- Phylum: Cressdnaviricota
- Class: Repensiviricetes
- Order: Geplafuvirales
- Family: Geminiviridae
- Genus: Curtovirus

Species
- See text

Genus of viruses

Curtovirus is a genus of ssDNA viruses, in the family Geminiviridae. Dicotyledonous plants serve as natural hosts. Curtoviruses are transmitted by leafhoppers. There are three species in this genus. Diseases associated with this genus include: Curly top disease.

== Taxonomy ==
The genus contains the following species, listed by scientific name and followed by the exemplar virus of the species:

- Curtovirus armoraciae, Horseradish curly top virus
- Curtovirus betae, Beet curly top virus
- Curtovirus spinaciae, Spinach severe curly top virus

== Structure ==
Viruses in Curtovirus are non-enveloped, with icosahedral geometries, and T=1 symmetry. The diameter is around 22 nm, with a length of 38 nm. Genomes are circular and non-segmented, around 3.0kb in length.

Genus	Structure	Symmetry	Capsid	Genomic arrangement	Genomic segmentation
Curtovirus	Twinned Icosahedral	Incomplete T=1	Non-enveloped	Circular	Monopartite

== Life cycle ==
Viral replication is nuclear. Entry into the host cell is achieved by penetration into the host cell. Replication follows the ssDNA rolling circle model. Dna templated transcription is the method of transcription. The virus exits the host cell by nuclear pore export, and tubule-guided viral movement. Dicotyledonous plants serve as the natural host. The virus is transmitted via a vector (beet leafhopper). Transmission routes are vector.

Genus	Host details	Tissue tropism	Entry details	Release details	Replication site	Assembly site	Transmission
Curtovirus	Dicotyledonous plants	Phloem-limited	Viral movement; mechanical inoculation	Budding	Nucleus	Nucleus	Beet leefhopper
