= Balclutha =

Balclutha may refer to:

- Balclutha (1886), a sailing ship
- Balclutha (leafhopper)
- Balclutha, New Zealand, a town
- Balclutha, a small, short-lived settlement of Louisa, Kentucky

== See also ==
- Alclutha
- Cameron baronets of Balclutha (1893)
