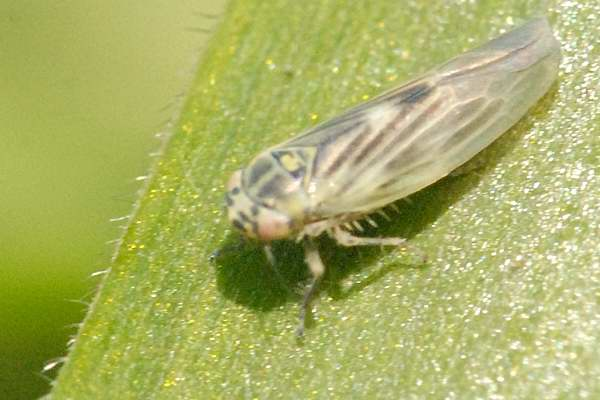
- Macrosteles horvathi from Commanster, Belgian High Ardennes

Scientific classification
- Kingdom: Animalia
- Phylum: Arthropoda
- Class: Insecta
- Order: Hemiptera
- Suborder: Auchenorrhyncha
- Family: Cicadellidae
- Tribe: Macrostelini
- Genus: Macrosteles; Fieber, 1866

Species
- see text

= Macrosteles =

Genus of true bugs

Macrosteles is a leafhopper genus in the tribe Macrostelini with more than 80 species, most in the northern hemisphere. Some species are known to migrate.

== Species ==
- Macrosteles alpinus (Zetterstedt, 1828)
- Macrosteles bimaculatus
- Macrosteles binotata
- Macrosteles borealis
- Macrosteles chobauti Ribaut, 1952
- Macrosteles cristatus (Ribaut, 1927)
- Macrosteles empetri (Ossiannilsson, 1935)
- Macrosteles fascifrons - the aster leafhopper
- Macrosteles guttatus
- Macrosteles horvathi
- Macrosteles laevis (Ribaut, 1927)
- Macrosteles latiaedeagus
- Macrosteles lepidus
- Macrosteles oshanini Razvyazkina, 1957
- Macrosteles parvidens
- Macrosteles quadrilineatus - the aster leafhopper
- Macrosteles slossonae
- Macrosteles tibetensis
- Macrosteles variatus
- many others.
