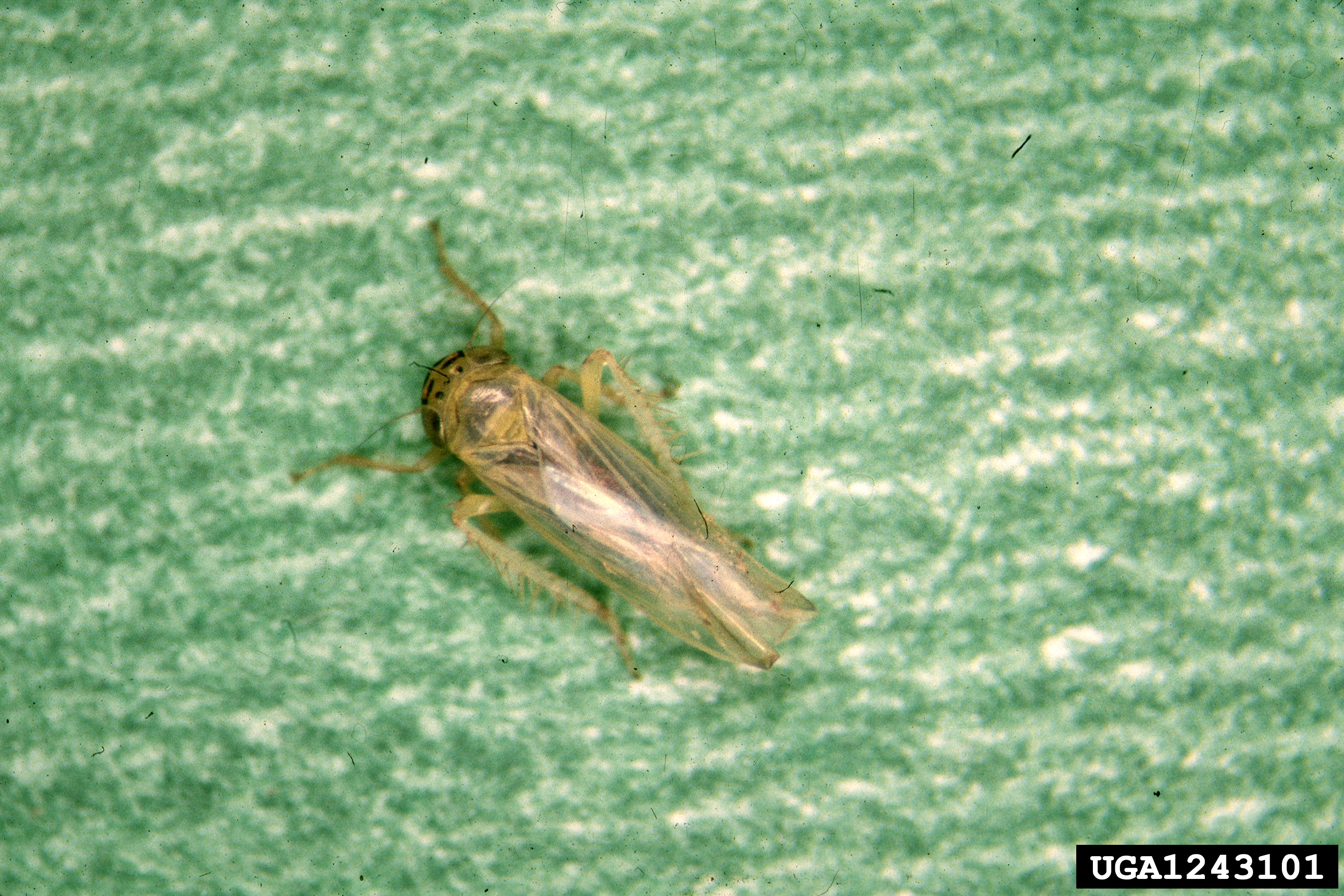
- Aster leafhopper

Scientific classification
- Domain: Eukaryota
- Kingdom: Animalia
- Phylum: Arthropoda
- Class: Insecta
- Order: Hemiptera
- Suborder: Auchenorrhyncha
- Family: Cicadellidae
- Genus: Macrosteles
- Species: M. quadrilineatus

Binomial name
- Macrosteles quadrilineatus Forbes, 1885

= Macrosteles quadrilineatus =

Species of true bug

Macrosteles quadrilineatus, the aster leafhopper or six-spotted leafhopper, is a leafhopper species in the genus Macrosteles, found in the United States. It is the vector of aster yellows disease, which affects various vegetable plants, weeds and ornamental plants.

== Description ==
The aster leafhopper is a small species, with males reaching about 3.3 mm (0.13 in) in length and females about 3.7 mm (0.15 in). The fore-wings are greyish-green while the abdomen is yellowish-green. Six pairs of minute black spots or streaks on the head give the insect its alternative name of six-spotted leafhopper.

== Ecology ==
In the United States, strong southerly winds in the spring carry adults northwards to the Mid West and northern parts of the country, and these insects usually arrive earlier and exceed in number the resident insects that have been overwintering there, mostly on grasses and cereals. Eggs are laid on a wide range of host plants which include grasses and clovers, corn, oats, rye, carrots and various weeds. The eggs hatch in about one week and the whole life cycle takes about four weeks. Carrot, dill, potato and radish are selected by adults for feeding purposes but are not good for breeding purposes.

The leafhopper is attacked by several parasitoids including Pachygonatopus minimus, Neogonatopus ombrodes and Epigonatopus plesius.

== Aster yellows ==
Aster yellows is a disease of various vegetable crops, weeds and ornamental plants and is transmitted almost entirely by the aster leafhopper. The disease is caused by phytoplasmas, specialised bacteria that are obligate parasites of plant tissue. The symptoms shown by the plant are a yellowing of the leaf veins followed by yellowing of the leaf blades, spindly stems with pale leaves, stunting of the plant, and deformed flowers, which sometimes show green colouring. Vegetable crops affected include carrot, celery, lettuce, potato, cucumber, pumpkin and squash.
