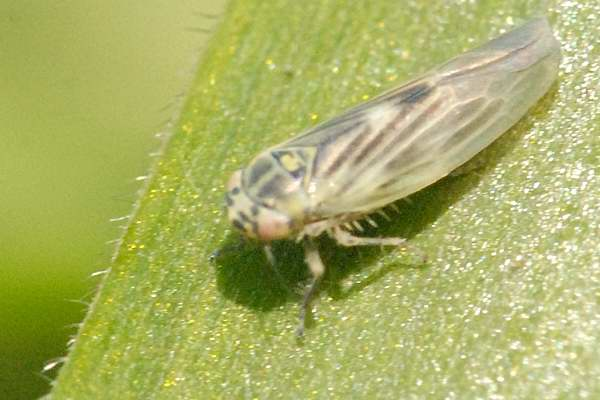
- Macrosteles horvathi from Commanster, Belgian High Ardennes

Scientific classification
- Kingdom: Animalia
- Phylum: Arthropoda
- Class: Insecta
- Order: Hemiptera
- Suborder: Auchenorrhyncha
- Family: Cicadellidae
- Subfamily: Deltocephalinae
- Tribe: Macrostelini; Kirkaldy, 1906

Genera
- 37, see text

Synonyms
- Balcluthini Baker, 1915; Gnathodini Baker, 1915; Coryphaelini Nast, 1972

= Macrostelini =

Tribe of true bugs

Macrostelini is a tribe in the Deltocephalinae subfamily of leafhoppers. Macrostelini contains 37 genera and over 300 species. The tribe has a cosmopolitan distribution. Some species in the genus Cicadulina are agricultural pests and transmit maize streak virus in Sub-saharan Africa.

== Genera ==
There are currently 37 described genera in Macrostelini:

- Aderganna Knight & Webb, 1993
- Afrosteles Theron, 1975
- Agelina Oman, 1938
- Alebranus Linnavuori, 1959
- Argaterma White, 1878
- Atlantocella Dlabola, 1982
- Balclutha Kirkaldy, 1900
- Baldulus Oman, 1934
- Balolina Knight & Webb, 1988
- Cicadabara Knight & Webb, 1993
- Cicadulella China, 1928
- Cicadulina China, 1926
- Cicaduloida Osborn, 1934
- Cortona Oman, 1938
- Coryphaelus Puton, 1886
- Dalbulus DeLong, 1950
- Davisonia Dorst, 1937
- Elrabonia Linnavuori, 1959
- Evinus Dlabola, 1977
- Kadrabolina Knight & Webb, 1993
- Macrosteles Fieber, 1866
- Marquesitettix Metcalf, 1952
- Masafuera Knight & Webb, 1993
- Nesoclutha Evans, 1947
- Nesolina Osborn, 1935
- Nesophyla Osborn, 1934
- Nesoriella Osborn, 1934
- Nyhimbricus Webb, 1986
- Paracicadula Osborn, 1934
- Sagatus Ribaut, 1948
- Sanctahelenia Dlabola, 1976
- Scaphoidulina Osborn, 1934
- Scaphosteles Knight & Webb, 1993
- Sonronius Dorst, 1937
- Stellena Theron, 1973
- Teyasteles Linnavuori, 1969
- Yamatotettix Matsumura, 1914
