= Alcluith =

Alcluith or Alclutha may refer to:

- Dumbarton Rock, Scotland, site of Dumbarton Castle
- Dumbarton, Scotland, built around the castle
- Bishop Auckland, England
- Alclutha F.C., football club in Dumbarton, 1872-1888

== See also ==
- John McFall, Baron McFall of Alcluith
- Balclutha
