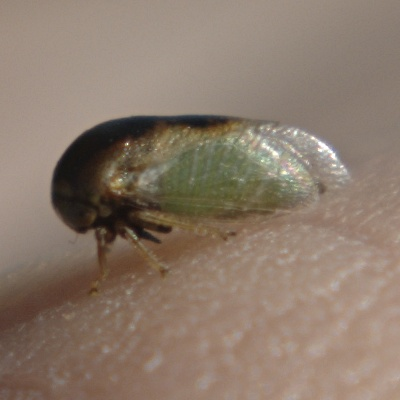

Scientific classification
- Kingdom: Animalia
- Phylum: Arthropoda
- Class: Insecta
- Order: Hemiptera
- Suborder: Auchenorrhyncha
- Family: Membracidae
- Genus: Micrutalis
- Species: M. malleifera

Binomial name
- Micrutalis malleifera Fowler, 1895

= Micrutalis malleifera =

Species of insect

Micrutalis malleifera, also known as the pseudo-curly top treehopper, is a species of the genus treehoppers in the family Memracidae, found in the southern United States and Central America.

It is capably of transmitting a Topocuvirus called Tomato pseudo-curly top virus. It is the only know member of the family Memracidae, to transmit a plant disease agent.

It has an average life cycle of 38 day and Females lay 22 to 130 eggs in their lives. The first record of M. mallefiera in the United States was in Florida in 1947.
