= Eragrovirus =

Virus classification
- (unranked): Virus
- Realm: Monodnaviria
- Kingdom: Shotokuvirae
- Phylum: Cressdnaviricota
- Class: Repensiviricetes
- Order: Geplafuvirales
- Family: Geminiviridae
- Genus: Eragrovirus

Genus of viruses

Eragrovirus is a genus of viruses, in the family Geminiviridae. Dicotyledonous plants serve as natural hosts. There is only one species in this genus: Eragrostis curvula streak virus (Eragrovirus curvulae).

== Structure ==
Viruses in Eragrovirus are non-enveloped, with icosahedral geometries, and T=1 symmetry. Genomes are circular and non-segmented, around 3.0kb in length.

Genus	Structure	Symmetry	Capsid	Genomic arrangement	Genomic segmentation
Eragrovirus	Twinned Icosahedral	Incomplete T=1	Non-enveloped	Circular	Monopartite

== Life cycle ==
Viral replication is nuclear. Entry into the host cell is achieved by penetration into the host cell. Replication follows the ssDNA rolling circle model. DNA-templated transcription is the method of transcription. The virus exits the host cell by nuclear pore export, and tubule-guided viral movement. Dicotyledonous plants serve as the natural host.

Genus	Host details	Tissue tropism	Entry details	Release details	Replication site	Assembly site	Transmission
Eragrovirus	Plants	None	Viral movement; mechanical inoculation	Budding	Nucleus	Nucleus	Treehopper; leafhopper
