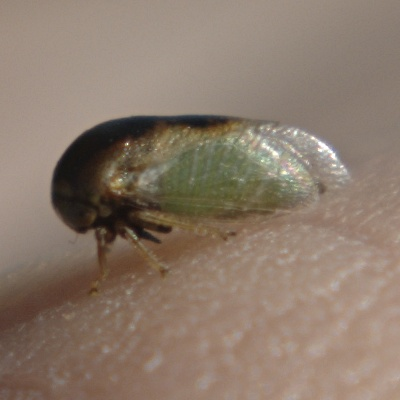

Scientific classification
- Domain: Eukaryota
- Kingdom: Animalia
- Phylum: Arthropoda
- Class: Insecta
- Order: Hemiptera
- Suborder: Auchenorrhyncha
- Family: Membracidae
- Subfamily: Smiliinae
- Genus: Micrutalis; Fowler, 1895

= Micrutalis =

Genus of treehoppers

Micrutalis is a genus of treehoppers in the family Membracidae. There are at least 30 described species in Micrutalis from the Americas.

== Species ==
These 33 species belong to the genus Micrutalis:

- Micrutalis apicalis Goding^{c g}
- Micrutalis atrovena Goding^{c g}
- Micrutalis balteata Fairmaire^{c g}
- Micrutalis bella Goding^{c g}
- Micrutalis binaria Fairmaire^{c g}
- Micrutalis callangensis Goding^{c g}
- Micrutalis calva Say^{c g b} (honeylocust treehopper)
- Micrutalis chapadensis Goding^{c g}
- Micrutalis discalis Walker^{c g}
- Micrutalis dorsalis (Fitch, 1851)^{c g b}
- Micrutalis ephippium Burmeister^{c g}
- Micrutalis flava Goding^{c g}
- Micrutalis geniculata Stål^{c g}
- Micrutalis godfreyi Sakakibara 1976^{c g}
- Micrutalis incerta Sakakibara 1976^{c g}
- Micrutalis lata Goding^{c g}
- Micrutalis lugubrina Stål^{c g}
- Micrutalis malleifera Fowler^{c g}
- Micrutalis melanogramma Perty^{c g}
- Micrutalis minuta Buckton, 1902^{g}
- Micrutalis nigrolineata Stål^{c g}
- Micrutalis nigromarginata Funkhouser^{c g}
- Micrutalis notatipennis Fowler^{c g}
- Micrutalis occidentalis Goding^{c g b}
- Micrutalis pallens Fowler^{c g}
- Micrutalis parva (Goding, 1893)^{c g b}
- Micrutalis plagiata Stål^{c g}
- Micrutalis punctifera Walker^{c g}
- Micrutalis stipulipennis Buckton^{c g}
- Micrutalis tartaredoides Goding^{c g}
- Micrutalis tau Goding^{c g}
- Micrutalis tripunctata Fairmaire^{c g}
- Micrutalis zeteki Goding^{c g}

Data sources: i = ITIS, c = Catalogue of Life, g = GBIF, b = Bugguide.net
