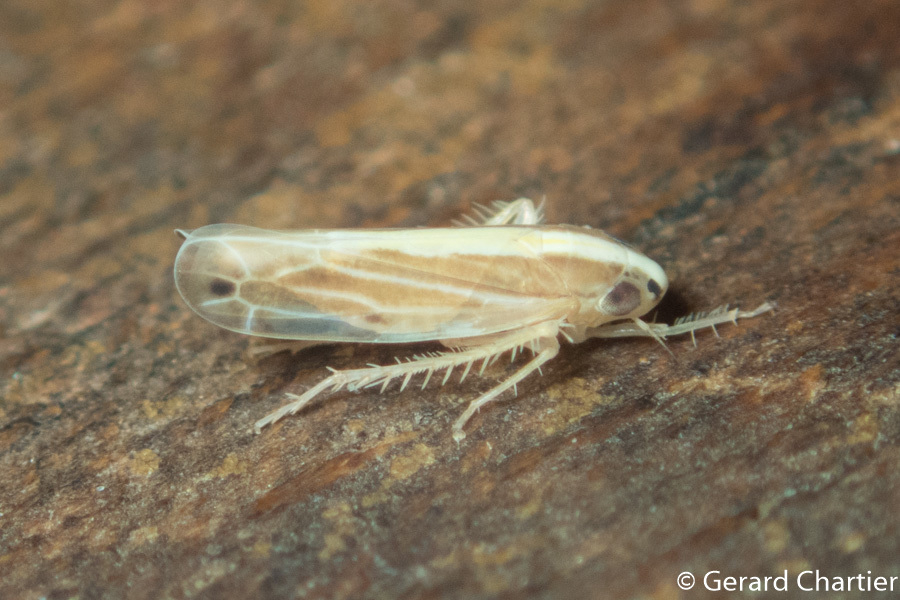
- Yamatotettix sp. photographed in Koh Kong, Cambodia

Scientific classification
- Kingdom: Animalia
- Phylum: Arthropoda
- Clade: Pancrustacea
- Class: Insecta
- Order: Hemiptera
- Suborder: Auchenorrhyncha
- Family: Cicadellidae
- Subfamily: Deltocephalinae
- Tribe: Macrostelini
- Genus: Yamatotettix; Matsumura, 1914

Type species
- Yamatotettix flavovittatus Matsumura, 1914

= Yamatotettix =

Genus of insects

Yamatotettix is a genus of leafhopper, first described in 1914 by Shōnen Matsumura.

Species of this genus are found on the Korean Peninsula, in Japan, China, Papua New Guinea, Indonesia, Taiwan, Thailand, Myanmar, Laos, and Malaysia.

== Species ==
Species listed by GBIF:

- Yamatotettix remanei Knight & Webb, 1993
- Yamatotettix nigromaculatus Ishihara, 1954
- Yamatotettix pacificus Webb, 1986
- Yamatotettix nigrilineus Li & Dai, 2003
- Yamatotettix sexnotatus (Izzard, 1955)
- Yamatotettix hongsaprugi Webb, 1986
- Yamatotettix flavovittatus Matsumura, 1914
