= Citrus chlorotic dwarf-associated virus =

Virus classification
- (unranked): Virus
- Realm: Floreoviria
- Kingdom: Shotokuvirae
- Phylum: Cressdnaviricota
- Class: Repensiviricetes
- Order: Geplafuvirales
- Family: Geminiviridae
- Species: Citrus chlorotic dwarf-associated virus

Plant virus

Citrus chlorotic dwarf-associated virus (CCDaV, genus Citlodavirus, family Geminiviridae) has been so far found in Turkey, China, and Thailand. Isolates from the three countries are genetically highly identical. CCDaV is currently considered as an emerging virus that threatens citrus plantations in the Mediterranean region.
