= Cicadulina chinai =

Scientific classification
- Kingdom: Animalia
- Phylum: Arthropoda
- Class: Insecta
- Order: Hemiptera
- Suborder: Auchenorrhyncha
- Family: Cicadellidae
- Genus: Cicadulina
- Species: C. chinai

Binomial name
- Cicadulina chinai Ghauri, 1964

Species of true bug

Cicadulina chinai is a species of true bug in the family Cicadellidae. It is a pest of millets.
