= Maize streak virus =

Pathogenic virus

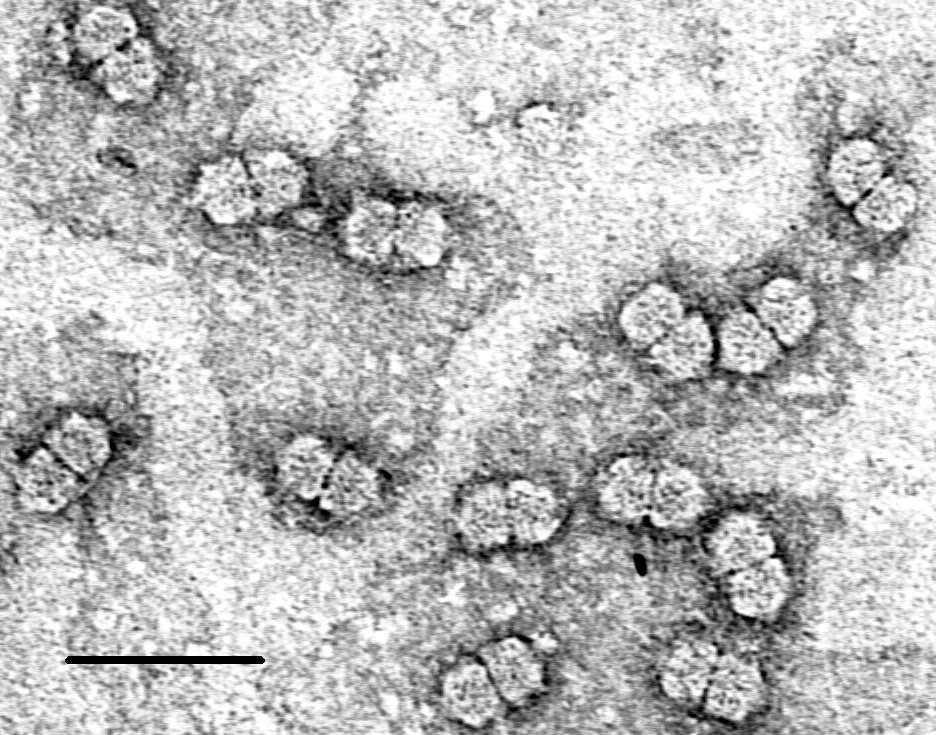
- Maize streak virus
- Common names: MSV, streak of maize
- Causal agents: Maize streak virus
- Hosts: maize, Urochloa panicoides
- Vectors: leafhoppers (C. mbila, C. storeyi, C. arachidis, C. dabrowski, other Cicadulina)
- EPPO Code: MSV000
- Distribution: sub-Saharan Africa

Maize streak virus

Virus classification
- (unranked): Virus
- Realm: Floreoviria
- Kingdom: Shotokuvirae
- Phylum: Cressdnaviricota
- Class: Repensiviricetes
- Order: Geplafuvirales
- Family: Geminiviridae
- Genus: Mastrevirus
- Species: Mastrevirus storeyi

Maize streak virus (MSV) is a virus primarily known for causing maize streak disease (MSD) in its major host, and which also infects over 80 wild and domesticated grasses. It is an insect-transmitted pathogen of maize in the genus Mastrevirus of the family Geminiviridae that is endemic in sub-Saharan Africa and neighbouring Indian Ocean island territories such as Madagascar, Mauritius and La Reunion. The A-strain of MSV (MSV-A) causes sporadic maize streak disease epidemics throughout the maize-growing regions of Africa. MSV was first described by the South African entomologist Claude Fuller who referred to it in a 1901 report as "mealie variegation".

The development of conventionally resistant maize varieties has been a priority since the 1950s in Kenya, Nigeria, South Africa and elsewhere, with a good deal of success: however, there are several genes associated with resistance, and breeding is complex. Transgenically resistant or genetically modified maize varieties were under development in South Africa, but the project has terminated without field trials of the candidate maize lines that were developed. Maize streak resistance is an important trait to maize breeders. Forward genetics is increasingly being used.

MSV is mainly vectored by Cicadulina mbila, and other Cicadulina species, such as C. storeyi, C. arachidis and C. dabrowski, are also able to transmit the virus.

Typical of all mastreviruses, MSV's circular, ~2.7-Kb monopartite single-stranded (ss) DNA genome encodes only four proteins. Bidirectional transcription from a long intergenic region (LIR) results in the virion-sense expression of a movement protein (MP) and a coat protein (CP), and the complementary-sense expression of the replication-associated proteins, Rep and RepA. Whereas the MP and CP are involved in virus movement and encapsidation, Rep is an essential initiator of virus replication, and RepA is a regulator of host and viral gene transcription. Due to genome size restrictions, MSV usurps host DNA replication and double-stranded DNA break repair proteins to replicate its genome via, respectively, rolling-circle and recombination-dependent mechanisms.
