= Claude Fuller (entomologist) =

Australian entomologist (1872–1928)

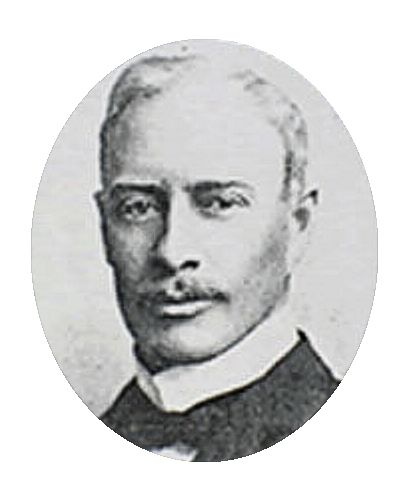

Claude W. Fuller (1 October 1872 Castle Hill, New South Wales – 5 November 1928 Lourenço Marques) graduated from Australia's Melbourne University. He worked as an entomologist in Australia but worked more extensively in South and Southern Africa.

At age 19, Fuller was first employed as a vegetable pathologist in New South Wales and transferred to Western Australia six years later. In 1898 he emigrated to the Cape Colony where he filled the post of Government entomologist. The following year he became the first Government entomologist in Natal where his brief became the control and eradication of subtropical pests. He widened the ambit of his post by doing a survey of local fungus diseases and plant parasites, and performed valuable work on the control of locusts. During his stay in Natal he devoted a large amount of time to the control and extermination of orchard pests and noxious weeds. He became one of the pioneers of termite taxonomy in Natal, continuing the work of the Swede Bror Yngve Sjöstedt.

Maize streak virus (MSV) was first observed by Fuller and described in his 1901 report as “mealie variegation" ('mealie' being the South African word for maize). It is widespread in Africa and Indian Ocean islands and is one of the continent's serious crop diseases. The virus is spread by insects and shows as pale yellow or yellow-white leaves, leading to stunted plants that cannot not produce cobs.

His studies of the Tsetse fly led him to believe that the existence of the Hluhluwe-Umfolozi Game Reserve and the Mkhuze Game Reserves in Zululand and the founding of the Kruger Park in the Transvaal lowveld, would create a corridor facilitating the resurgence of the fly from Southern Rhodesia and Portuguese East Africa. Fuller enjoyed the support of prominent veterinarians such as Arnold Theiler and Petrus du Toit.

In 1904 he published a book dealing with the cultivation of fruit trees in Natal. In the same year he went to Brazil to bring back a parasite to control fruit flies which had become a major pest in South African orchards. From 1910 he served as Assistant Chief of the Division of Entomology for the Union of South Africa, retiring in 1926 and working as entomologist in Portuguese East Africa.

He was killed in a car accident in 1928 outside the Mozambique town of Lourenço Marques, the present-day Maputo.

== Bibliography ==
- The termites of South Africa – Claude Fuller, (South African Biological Society, 1921)
- Observations on some South African termites – Claude Fuller, (Annals of the Natal Museum, 1919)
- Tsetse in the Transvaal and Surrounding Territories – An Historical Review – Claude Fuller, (Division of Entomology, 1923)
- Louis Trigardt's Trek across the Drakensberg, 1837–1838 – Claude Fuller, edited by Leo Fouché (The Van Riebeeck Society, 1932)
