= Cicadulina =

Scientific classification
- Domain: Eukaryota
- Kingdom: Animalia
- Phylum: Arthropoda
- Class: Insecta
- Order: Hemiptera
- Suborder: Auchenorrhyncha
- Family: Cicadellidae
- Subfamily: Deltocephalinae
- Tribe: Macrostelini
- Genus: Cicadulina; Naudé

Species
- Cicadulina arachidis; Cicadulina bimaculata Evans; Cicadulina bipunctata China, the maize orange leafhopper; Cicadulina bipunctella Matsumura; Cicadulina chinai Ghauri; Cicadulina ghaurii; Cicadulina latens; Cicadulina mbila Naudé, the maize leafhopper; Cicadulina parazeae; Cicadulina similis; Cicadulina storeyi China; Cicadulina triangula

Genus of true bugs

Cicadulina is a leafhopper genus in the tribe Macrostelini.

Cicadulina species are vectors of the maize streak virus, a disease which is a sporadic but severe in sub-Saharan Africa. The cause is a geminivirus which is persistently transmitted by Cicadulina leafhoppers. The disease is also transmitted to Urochloa panicoides, a fodder grass originating in Southern Africa.

The maize orange leafhopper Cicadulina bipunctata has been reported to induce gall-like structures on maize in Japan.
