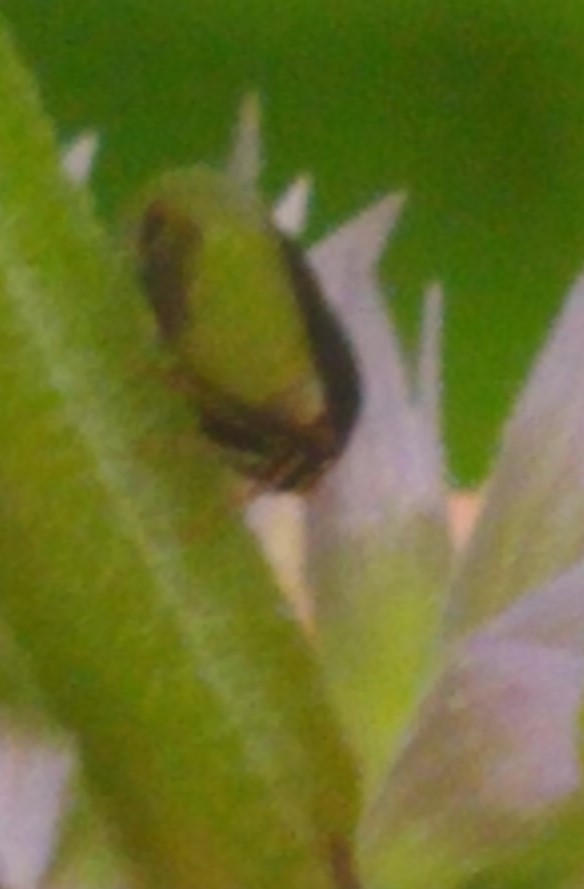

Scientific classification
- Domain: Eukaryota
- Kingdom: Animalia
- Phylum: Arthropoda
- Class: Insecta
- Order: Hemiptera
- Suborder: Auchenorrhyncha
- Family: Membracidae
- Genus: Micrutalis
- Species: M. calva

Binomial name
- Micrutalis calva (Say, 1831)

= Micrutalis calva =

Species of insect

Micrutalis calva is a species of Hemiptera found in North America. It feeds on numerous plants, including ragweed, sunflower, wormwood, sycamore, alfalfa, and honeylocust. Nymphs specifically can often be found on the flowers of Vernonia.
