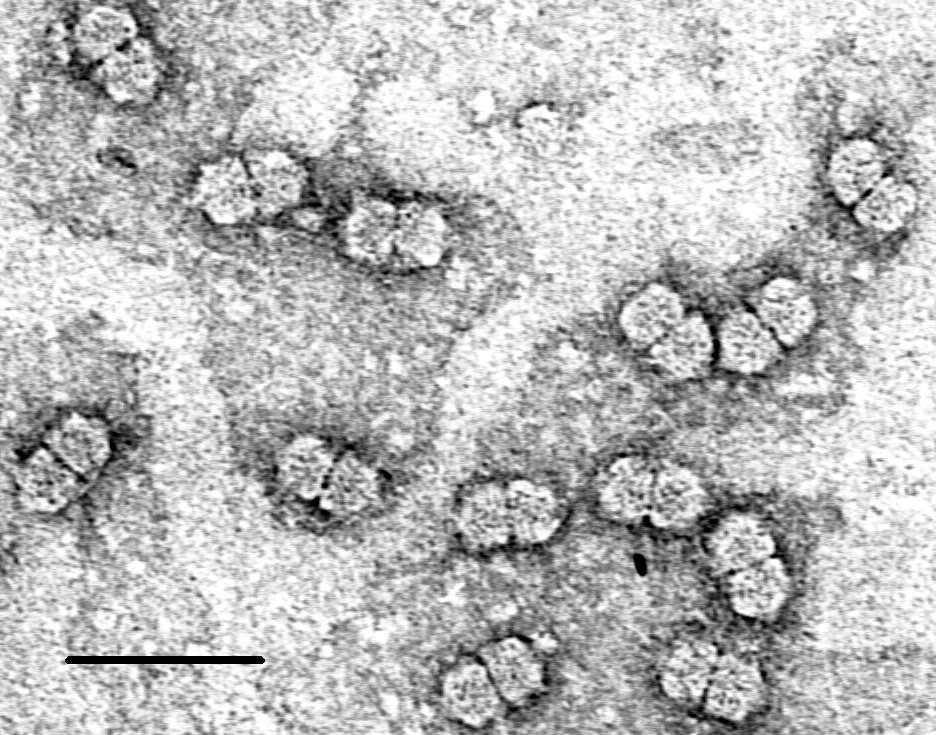
- Purified Maize streak virus (MSV) particles stained with uranyl acetate. Size bar indicates 50 nm.

Virus classification
- (unranked): Virus
- Realm: Floreoviria
- Kingdom: Shotokuvirae
- Phylum: Cressdnaviricota
- Class: Repensiviricetes
- Order: Geplafuvirales
- Family: Geminiviridae

Genera
- See text

= Geminiviridae =

Family of viruses

Geminiviridae is a family of plant viruses that encode their genetic information on a circular genome of single-stranded (ss) DNA. The family contains 18 genera. Diseases associated with this family include: bright yellow mosaic, yellow mosaic, yellow mottle, leaf curling, stunting, streaks, reduced yields. They have single-stranded circular DNA genomes encoding genes that diverge in both directions from a virion strand origin of replication (i.e. geminivirus genomes are ambisense). According to the Baltimore classification they are considered class II viruses. It is the largest known family of single stranded DNA viruses.

Mastrevirus and curtovirus transmission is via various leafhopper species (e.g. maize streak virus and other African streak viruses are transmitted by Cicadulina mbila), the only known topocuvirus species, Tomato pseudo-curly top virus, is transmitted by the treehopper Micrutalis malleifera, and begomoviruses are transmitted by the whitefly species, Bemisia tabaci.

These viruses are responsible for a significant amount of crop damage worldwide. Epidemics of geminivirus diseases have arisen due to a number of factors, including the recombination of different geminiviruses coinfecting a plant, which enables novel, possibly virulent viruses to be developed. Other contributing factors include the transport of infected plant material to new locations, expansion of agriculture into new growing areas, and the expansion and migration of vectors that can spread the virus from one plant to another.

== Virology ==
The genome of ssDNA can either be a single component between 2500 and 3100 nucleotides, or, in the case of some begomoviruses, two similar-sized components each between 2600 and 2800 nucleotides. They have elongated, geminate capsids with two incomplete T=1 icosahedra joined at the missing vertex. The capsids range in size from 18 to 20 nm in diameter with a length of about 30 nm. Begomoviruses with two component (i.e. bipartite) genomes have these components separated into two different particles both of which must usually be transmitted together to initiate a new infection within a suitable host cell.

== Taxonomy ==
The following genera are recognized:

- Becurtovirus
- Begomovirus
- Capulavirus
- Citlodavirus
- Cobecusvirus
- Curtovirus
- Eragrovirus
- Grablovirus
- Maldovirus
- Mastrevirus
- Mulcrilevirus
- Oleurovirus
- Opunvirus
- Pylecuvirus
- Topilevirus
- Topocuvirus
- Turncurtovirus
- Welwivirus

Several additional genera have been proposed: Baminivirus, Nimivirus and Niminivirus.

== Replication ==
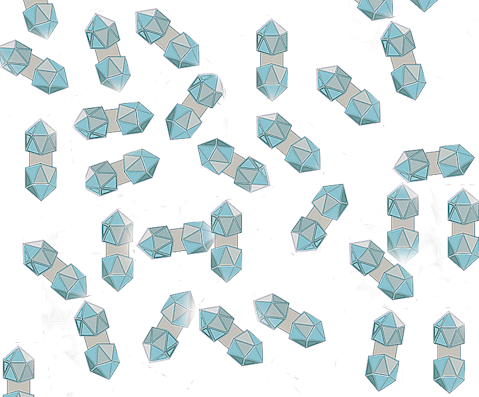
Drawing of geminiviruses

Geminivirus genomes encode only a few proteins; thus, they are dependent on host cell factors for replication: these include factors such as DNA polymerase—and probably repair polymerases—in order to amplify their genomes, as well as transcription factors. Geminiviruses replicate via a rolling circle mechanism like bacteriophages such as M13, and many plasmids. Replication occurs within the nucleus of an infected plant cell. First the single-stranded circular DNA is converted to a double-stranded circular intermediate. This step involves the use of cellular DNA repair enzymes to produce a complementary negative-sense strand, using the viral genomic or plus-sense DNA strand as a template. The next step is the rolling circle phase, where the viral strand is cleaved at a specific site situated within the origin of replication by the viral Rep protein in order to initiate replication. This process in a eukaryotic nucleus can give rise to concatemeric double-stranded forms of replicative intermediate genomes, although double-stranded unit circles can be isolated from infected plants and cells. New single-stranded DNA forms of the virus genome (plus-sense) are probably formed by interaction of the coat protein with replicating DNA intermediates, as genomes lacking a CP gene do not form ssDNA. The ssDNA is packaged into germinate particles in the nucleus. It is not clear if these particles can then leave the nucleus and be transmitted to surrounding cells as virions, or whether ssDNA associated with coat protein and a movement protein is the form of the genome that gets trafficked from cell to cell via the plasmodesmata.

These viruses tend to be introduced into and initially infect differentiated plant cells, via the piercing mouthparts of the vector insect: however, these cells generally lack the host enzymes necessary for DNA replication, making it difficult for the virus to replicate. To overcome this block geminiviruses can induce plant cells to reenter the cell cycle from a quiescent state so that viral replication can occur.

=== Virus Rep protein ===
The only protein encoded in the viral genome that is essential for geminiviral DNA replication is the geminiviral replication protein Rep. Rep initiates rolling circle replication of the viral DNA and interacts with other host proteins that are components of the replication machinery.

=== Host RAD54 and DNA polymerases ===
Host protein RAD54 modulates geminiviral DNA replication. RAD54 protein acts in DNA recombination and repair and appears to be necessary for rolling circle replication of the viral DNA. Also, replication of the geminivirus DNA is mediated by the host plant DNA polymerases alpha and delta.

== Evolution ==
These viruses may have evolved from a phytoplasma plasmid. Geminiviruses are capable of horizontal gene transfer of genetic information to the plant host.

== See also ==
- Citrus chlorotic dwarf-associated virus
