= Topocuvirus =

Virus classification
- (unranked): Virus
- Realm: Monodnaviria
- Kingdom: Shotokuvirae
- Phylum: Cressdnaviricota
- Class: Repensiviricetes
- Order: Geplafuvirales
- Family: Geminiviridae
- Genus: Topocuvirus

Genus of viruses

Topocuvirus is a genus of viruses, in the family Geminiviridae. Dicotyledonous plants serve as natural hosts. There is only one species in this genus: Tomato pseudo-curly top virus (Topocuvirus solani). Diseases associated with this genus include: vein swelling, curling of the leaves and leaf distortion.

== Structure ==
Viruses in Topocuvirus are non-enveloped, with icosahedral geometries, and T=1 symmetry. The diameter is around 22 nm, with a length of 38 nm. Genomes are circular and non-segmented, around 2.86kb in length.

Genus	Structure	Symmetry	Capsid	Genomic arrangement	Genomic segmentation
Topocuvirus	Twinned Icosahedral	Incomplete T=1	Non-enveloped	Circular	Monopartite

== Life cycle ==
Viral replication is nuclear. Entry into the host cell is achieved by penetration into the host cell. Replication follows the ssDNA rolling circle model. DNA-templated transcription is the method of transcription. The virus exits the host cell by nuclear pore export, and tubule-guided viral movement. Dicotyledonous plants serve as the natural host. The virus is transmitted via a vector (treehopper). Transmission routes are vector.

Genus	Host details	Tissue tropism	Entry details	Release details	Replication site	Assembly site	Transmission
Topocuvirus	Dicotyledonous plants	None	Cell receptor endocytosis	Budding	Nucleus	Nucleus	Leafhopper
