= Turncurtovirus =

Virus classification
- (unranked): Virus
- Realm: Monodnaviria
- Kingdom: Shotokuvirae
- Phylum: Cressdnaviricota
- Class: Repensiviricetes
- Order: Geplafuvirales
- Family: Geminiviridae
- Genus: Turncurtovirus

Species
- See text

Genus of viruses

Turncurtovirus is a genus of viruses, in the family Geminiviridae. Dicotyledonous plants serve as natural hosts. There are three species in this genus.

== Taxonomy ==
The genus contains the following species, listed by scientific name and followed by the exemplar virus of the species:

- Turncurtovirus brassicae, Turnip curly top virus
- Turncurtovirus rapae, Turnip leaf roll virus
- Turncurtovirus sesami, Sesame curly top virus

== Structure ==
Viruses in Turncurtovirus are non-enveloped, with icosahedral geometries, and T=1 symmetry. Genomes are circular and non-segmented, around 3.0kb in length.

Genus	Structure	Symmetry	Capsid	Genomic arrangement	Genomic segmentation
Turncurtovirus	Twinned Icosahedral	Incomplete T=1	Non-enveloped	Circular	Monopartite

== Life cycle ==
Viral replication is nuclear. Entry into the host cell is achieved by penetration into the host cell. Replication follows the ssDNA rolling circle model. DNA-templated transcription is the method of transcription. The virus exits the host cell by nuclear pore export, and tubule-guided viral movement. Dicotyledonous plants serve as the natural host.

Genus	Host details	Tissue tropism	Entry details	Release details	Replication site	Assembly site	Transmission
Turncurtovirus	Turnip	None	Cell receptor endocytosis	Budding	Nucleus	Nucleus	Leafhopper
