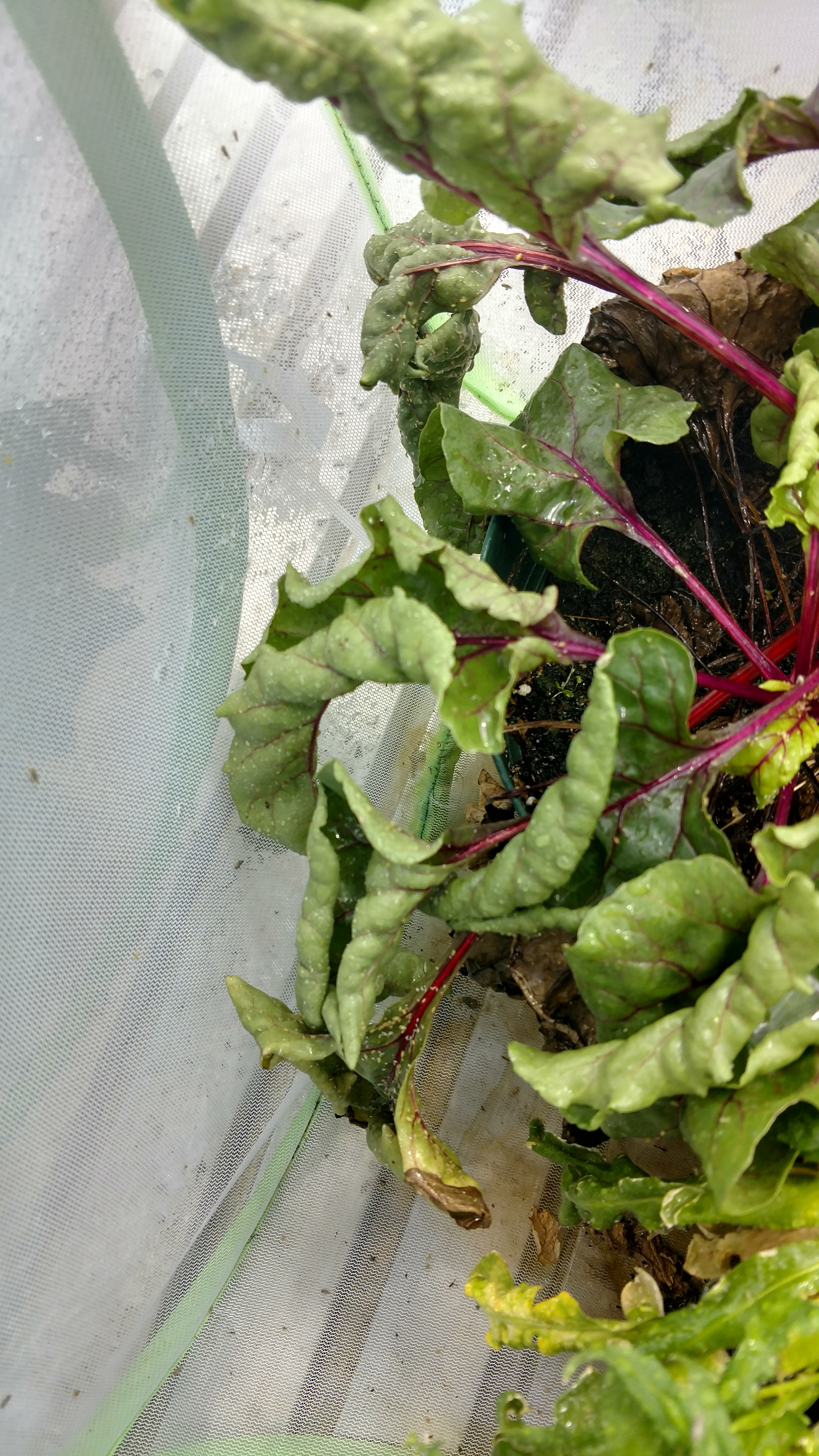
- Beet plant infected with BCTV

Virus classification
- (unranked): Virus
- Realm: Floreoviria
- Kingdom: Shotokuvirae
- Phylum: Cressdnaviricota
- Class: Repensiviricetes
- Order: Geplafuvirales
- Family: Geminiviridae
- Genus: Curtovirus
- Species: Curtovirus betae

Synonyms
- Beet curly top virus-Iran; Sugarbeet curly top virus; Sugarbeet curly leaf virus; Sugarbeet virus 1; Tomato yellows virus; Western yellows blight virus

= Beet curly top virus =

Species of virus

Beet curly top virus (BCTV) is a pathogenic plant virus of the family Geminiviridae, containing a single-stranded DNA. The family Geminiviridae contains 15 genera based on their host range, virus genome structure, and type of insect vector. BCTV is a curtovirus affecting hundreds of plants. The only known vector is the beet leafhopper, which is native to the Western United States.

== History ==
Beet curly top virus was first discovered in 1888 in the Western parts of the United States. The virus wasn't fully recognized until 1907 when people started to realize that the virus was affecting their crops which led to increasing yield loss. As the BCTV began to surface and multiply within the United States, it affected many states (California, Idaho, Utah, and Washington) located in the Western area. According to the Environmental Protection Agency (EPA), many crops were destroyed by the disease and led to considerable economic loss. The BCTV has also been known to affect other countries including Mexico, South America, and the Old World (the Mediterranean basin and the Middle East).

== Structure ==
BCTV contains a single-stranded circular DNA that is encapsulated in a twinned icosahedral capsid. The virus DNA contains a monopartite genome that is made up of three viral sense and four complementary open reading frames (ORF). The ORF Complementary 1 (C1) contains the code for the replication initiator protein (Rep) which is responsible for initiating replication with a host cell. C3 also plays an important role in the replication process. C2 is involved in causing the disease (pathogenicity) while C4 plays an important role in developing the major symptoms that comes with the virus, such as hyperplasia, curling of the leaves, and deformation.

== Transmission ==
BCTV is transmitted to nymphs of beet leafhoppers when they feed on the phloem of plants that are infected with the virus. Even though the leafhopper is infected with the virus, the virus does not replicate within the leafhopper and causes no harm to them. BCTV cannot be passed on to their offspring. The only way for offspring to be infected with the virus is if they fed on any plants infected with the BCTV. Once the beet leafhoppers ingest the virus, it moves from their digestive tract to the salivary glands. Once the infected leafhoppers migrate and feed on healthy plants, they transmit the virus by eating the phloem. The infected beet leafhoppers are able to infect various plants for the rest of their lifetime.

== Hosts ==
BCTV has been known to affect more than 300 plant species from 44 different families. Sugar beets are known to be the main host for this virus but it also affects many plants including beans, celery, spinach, melons, peppers, squashes, cucumbers, and tomatoes. Younger plants seem to be more susceptible to damage and developed more symptoms from the virus compared to adult plants. It has been shown that the BCTV tend to infect more dicotyledonous hosts while no monocotyledonous plants have been recognized as a host for this virus.

== Symptoms ==
Plants that are infected will tend to display early symptoms within 5 days. The BCTV causes many symptoms including:

- Vein swelling (the earliest and most common symptom)
- Leaf curling
- Yellowing of leaves with purple veins
- Necrosis and hyperplasia of the phloem
- Fruit deformation
- Premature fruit ripening
- Reduced fruit quality and yield
- Stunting
- Death of young seedlings

== Environment ==
The beet leafhopper is commonly found in tropical and subtropical countries that have warm climates. They have been found to be residing within the Western part of the United States, Mexico, South America, and the Old World (the Mediterranean basin and the Middle East). During the winter in California, the beet leafhopper would migrate to the foothill of the coastal range located on the west side of the Central Valley and lay eggs in the perennial weeds and buckhorn plantains. When the nymphs of beet leafhoppers are born, they would consume the infected weeds and plants causing them to acquire the virus. During the mid to late spring, the adult leafhoppers would travel to the agricultural area of the Central Valley to infect other healthy plants and weeds. As fall approaches, the adult leafhoppers migrate back to the foothill and begin the process again.

== Environmental impacts ==
The BCTV caused many problems for farmers. When the virus was first recognized in 1907, California farmers were detrimentally affected and had a large yield loss in crops. Other states including Idaho were also greatly affected by the virus. The BCTV nearly wiped out Idaho's sugar beet industry until they effectively developed sugar beets that were resistant to the virus in 1935. From the early 1900s till now, farmers are still having difficulties in containing this virus. In 2001, the Central Valley located in California had an enormous loss in crops valuing up to millions of dollars. In 2002, the bean production located in the Columbian basin of Washington State was also afflicted with the virus and encountered many losses.

== Treatment and management ==
As the BCTV became more difficult to manage, many methods were developed to help contain this virus. Methods included breeding curly top virus resistant crops, planting earlier or later in the year, the use of insecticides, and weed management.

In 1918, the first project known to produce resistant sugar beets was established. After developing their first curly top resistant sugar beets in 1926, researchers determined the plants were unable to fully resist the virus and were still susceptible to infection.

Due to the increasing number of curly top virus outbreaks in California, many groups joined in the development of curly top resistant cultivars. California was successful in developing curly top resistant cultivars that were suitable to growing conditions in California. This method was soon abandoned in the mid-1900s due to low yields. The high yielding susceptible crops were quickly adopted across parts of California that were not affected with the BCTV. Crop production was successful for several years until the virus resurfaced in 2001 and 2003, causing major losses.

Many states which were afflicted with the BCTV soon began using insecticides to reduce the number of BCTV outbreaks. In 1943, California adopted the BCTV management program, which is still running today. This program focuses on the use of insecticides to reduce the amount of beet leafhoppers by spraying chemicals in non-crop areas where the beet leafhoppers reside. Killing the beet leafhoppers before they invade susceptible host crops leads to fewer crops being infected. Slowly, the use of insecticides was questioned due to its effects on the environment, non-target organisms, and endangered species. As the number of beet leafhoppers continued to rise, the EPA ordered the use of clothianidin to help control the insects in 2006, 2007 and 2008.

In 1949, another curly top management program was developed in southern Idaho. It focused on the use of insecticides and specific planting times to control the virus. The method of specific planting dates was inconsistent and led to an unsuccessful management of the virus. In 1969, the program was eliminated due to the increase in urbanization and shortage of funds available to keep the program running.

In Arizona, field observations indicated that a delay in planting until late October to November may help decrease BCTV incidence; however, changing the planting dates may not always be successful because the movements of beet leafhoppers are inconsistent and unpredictable. Many weeds are also host for the beet leafhoppers; therefore, proper weed control can help decrease the incidence of BCTV.
