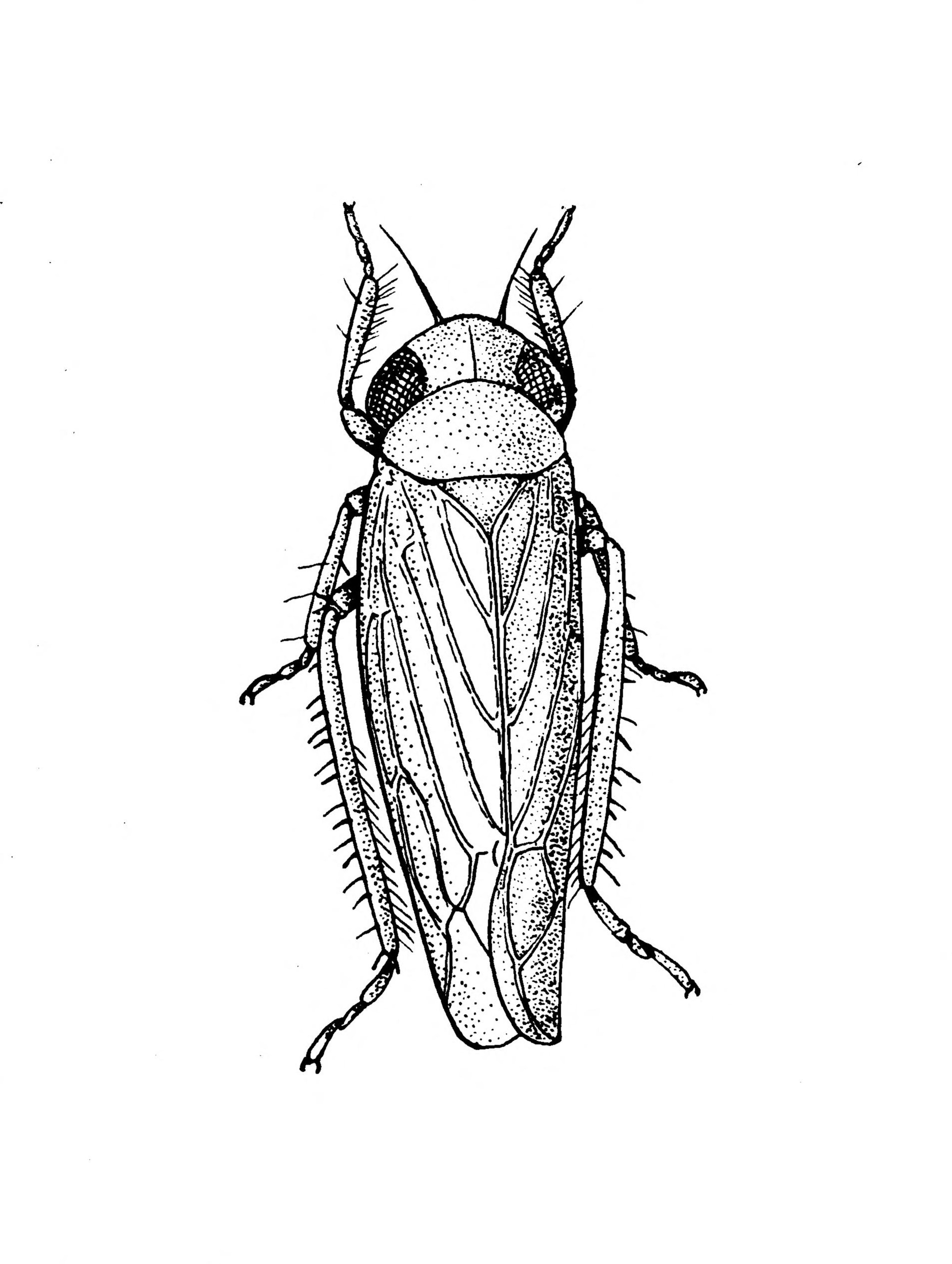

Scientific classification
- Kingdom: Animalia
- Phylum: Arthropoda
- Clade: Pancrustacea
- Class: Insecta
- Order: Hemiptera
- Suborder: Auchenorrhyncha
- Family: Cicadellidae
- Genus: Circulifer
- Species: C. tenellus

Binomial name
- Circulifer tenellus (Baker, 1896)

= Beet leafhopper =

Species of insect

The beet leafhopper (Circulifer tenellus), also sometimes known as Neoaliturus tenellus, is a species of leafhopper which belongs to the family Cicadellidae in the order Hemiptera.

== Morphology ==
A lot of morphological diversity has been reported among populations of the beet leafhopper in the United States. Morphological descriptions of two different populations of beet leafhoppers from California and Mexico are presented here. The leaf hopper is described as a small insect, 3–3.5 mm (0.12–0.14 in) in length, that is often greenish yellow, tan or olive in colour. The leaf hopper may have darker markings on its wings, pronotum, abdomen and head if it has developed during colder temperatures. The general shape of the body has been described as "wedge shaped" with the body tapering off at the posterior end of the insect.

The head of the insect is wider than the pronotum with distinct eyes and a curved anterior margin. The mouth parts, like that of all hemipterans, have stylets used for penetration into plants and sucking. The seta, or hair present on the body are uniseriate, meaning that they are arranged in a row are present on the hind tibia of the insect. One of the distinguishing feature of this species is also the presence of plates on males. For general information on insect anatomy see: Insect morphology.

== Feeding behaviors ==
Beet leafhoppers are polyphagous generalists which means that they are able to feed on various different types of host (biology) plants. The fact that these insects migrate during the spring and summer time to cultivated fields also means that they show a lot of variation in their host plant choices by season: feeding on desert weeds in the winter and feeding on cultivated fields in the summer. They also show incredible variation in food choices between populations in different states, and these choices may change depending on host plant diversity, availability, defenses, etc. In one study on host plant preferences of beet leafhoppers from California and New Mexico, researchers found that beet leafhoppers from California preferred to feed on sugar beet plants while those from New Mexico preferred to feed on kochia, Russian thistle and redwood pigweed plants. The study also found differences in short term and long term feeding preferences where both kinds of leaf hoppers initially settled on beet plants (when observed over a period of 2 days) and later moved to their preferred choices (when observed over 20 days). Despite these differences, both species chose beet plants for laying eggs.

Studies of insect feeding patterns can be conducted using electrical penetration graphs which allow researchers to match electrical waveforms to specific feeding behaviors in insects. Insects may choose to feed on different parts of a plant. By studying the waveforms produced for different feeding behaviors and then matching them to video images and histology of insects feeding, researchers can classify which part of a plant an insect feeds on. These waveforms may also give other valuable feeding information like the speed at which an insect feeds.

For the beet leafhopper, understanding feeding is important as feeding is a mechanism through which insect borne plant diseases spread. So far, the beet leafhopper is the only known vector of the Beet curly top virus, which spreads through plant phloem tissues. Therefore, researchers conducted electrical penetration graph experiments of leaf hoppers in which they wired beet leafhoppers to an EPG machine and characterized the types of waveforms produced. The data showed that beet leafhoppers primarily ingested phloem sap along with xylem and mesophyll sap. What was surprising however was that the rate of phloem ingestion in beet leafhoppers is significantly lower than that in other sap feeding insects. This leads researchers to believe that beet leafhoppers are unable to use the natural turgor pressure of phloem sap in order to ingest fluid and may need to use muscles to actively draw sap from phloem.

== Life history ==
=== Growth and generation times ===
A study of beet leafhoppers in Idaho showed that they are capable of producing multiple generations within a year, with generally 3 different generations produced in Idaho in a year. The insects are active in mustard and flixweed plants over winter and females begin laying eggs in March. The adults from this generation mature by May when they may migrate to beet fields to mate and lay eggs for the second annual generation to be born. The third generation matures to adulthood by early September or October when these insects migrate back to their winter habitats. There is evidence that this migration may be related to seasonal temperatures as leafhoppers migrated to beet fields later during colder seasons. Researchers proposed that these later migrations can decrease damage to beet fields as the leafhoppers stay on the fields for shorter periods of time overall.

The study showed that temperature had a significant impact on the growth rate and development of the embryo within the leafhopper egg, with higher temperatures generally being proportionally related to quicker development. The optimal range of temperatures for the development of these insects is between 65 and 95 °F (18 and 35 °C). This means that development takes longer over winter for these insects as compared to spring and summer times. Since development is very closely related to temperature, researchers in the study also concluded that the number of leafhopper generations produced in a year may be related to the seasonal temperatures of their habitat. They found that under lab conditions, where the leafhoppers were raised in optimal temperatures of 95 °F (35 °C), as many as 15–16 generations of leafhoppers could be produced per year. However they cited that actual numbers of generations per year may be limited to up to eight generations in the warmer parts of the Southern United States. This may be partly because other factors like the seasonal availability of beet plants as food, may also impact the number of generations in a year. Generally beet plants are harvested in October which would limit food resources for the beet leafhopper in the fall.

=== Life cycle ===
The life cycle of the beet leafhopper consists of three stages: eggs, nymphs and adults. The insects grow through 5 different molts during development which provides 5 instars before they reach adulthood. The growth patterns in the size of the instars follow a sigmoidal curve which means that there is greatest increase in size among younger instars and the rate of growth decreases as the instars reach adulthood.

=== Colouration ===
Beet leafhoppers may show different coloration based on the time of year that they mature in. Generally, adults that mature during warmer temperatures in the spring and summer time show light green or yellowish colouration. This is different from adults that mature in the winter which generally show darker markings on their wings and pronotum. These changes in colouration may be due to changes in seasonal temperatures as sometimes leafhoppers who mature in colder spring temperatures also show darker colouration like that of winter leafhoppers. Some researchers believe that these changes in colouration occur according to the surrounding temperatures of the last leaf hopper instars as this is the stage during which wings develop. This may also be backed by the fact that adult leaf hopper do not change colour once they have matured regardless of the temperature of their environment.

== Vector of disease ==
=== Citrus stubborn disease ===
Several studies conducted in the 1970s and 1980s showed that the beet leafhopper is a vector (epidemiology) of the Spiroplasma citri prokaryote which is the causal agent of the Citrus Stubborn Disease.

==== Mode of transmission ====
The bacterium S. citri is initially acquired by the leafhopper through feeding on a plant that has already been infected. Through feeding, the prokaryote enters the gut of the beet leafhopper where most of its cells are killed, but some do survive. These surviving organisms then enter the epithelial cells of the intestine and multiply. Eventually the organisms are able to make their way into the hemocoel of the insect through which they are transferred to the insect’s salivary glands. When the insect then feeds on healthy plants, the prokaryotes enter the phloem of the plant and thus infect the new plant. One study has shown that this process of transmission also has negative effects on the leafhopper itself, where significant numbers of leafhoppers may die after being infected with S. citri. The researchers suggest that this increased mortality may be as a result of ingesting toxins that are produced either by S. citri itself or by plants defending themselves against the pathogen. In any case, these toxins have a significant on the longevity of infected beet leafhoppers.

Another study tested some of the characteristics that are important for transmission of S. citri by the beet leafhopper. Researchers tested the impacts of modes of acquisition on the latent period of S. citri within the leafhopper and found that insects that had been injected directly with the prokaryote in their gut had the lowest latency period of 10 days followed by leafhoppers who had ingested the pathogen from an infected plant (16 days). In testing the time taken for the insects to acquire S. citri, the acquisition access period, researchers found that a time period of at least 6 hours of feeding on S. citri cultures were required for insects to acquire the pathogen. However this study should be viewed critically as insects were membrane fed a culture of the organism to determine this time period and actual results may vary when insects feed on an infected plants. The study also found that the numbers of host plants that were infected with S. citri increased with the numbers of infected leafhoppers that were feeding on these plants.

==== Movements of Spiroplasma citri inside beet leafhopper hosts ====
In an experiment to understand how S. citri cells move within the beet leafhopper, researchers inoculated insects with the pathogen and then observed the locations of S. citri inside the leafhoppers using electron microscopy. They observed S. citri in the gut as well as the salivary glands of the insects which further proves that the pathogen may be transmitted by the mechanisms described in the studies above. In particular, researchers observed that S. citri were often found within gut epithelial and salivary gland cells on infected hosts within small membrane bound vesicles. This led them to believe that the S. citri pathogen may be using cell mediated endocytosis as a predominant way to enter gut and salivary cells and may be travelling directly though the cells rather than travelling in the spaces between cell membranes of individual cells through a process called diacytosis. They also observed damage to muscle cells in the gut and salivary glands of insects infected with S. citri which is evidence that S. citri causes damage to the beet leafhoppers when it uses them as vectors. However the authors also noted how this damage was not as significant as seen in other insects which may suggest that the beet leafhopper may be co-evolving to reduce harm by S. citri pathogens.

In a follow-up study to understand the exact mechanism of uptake of S. citri cells by beet leafhopper gut cells, researchers developed a line of beet leafhopper cells called the CT1 cell line. They used this cell line to study how leafhopper cells interacted with S. citri cells in vivo. After incubation of beet leafhopper cells with S. citri cells, researchers used an electron microscope to see how cell lines interact. They found that S. citri cells were pressed against the cell membranes of C. tenellus cells, and they also observed invaginations of the cell membrane. They concluded that these sighting were consistent with previous studies which suggested that S. citri cells are taken up by beet leafhopper cells by endocytosis.

=== Beet curly top virus ===
The beet leafhopper is the lone insect vector of the beet curly top virus (BCTV) which causes disease in many important crops like beans, sugar beet, cantaloupe, cucumber, peppers, spinach, squash, tomato, watermelon and other important plants. The beet leafhopper is also responsible for transmission of two other strains of the Beet curly top virus, which according to literature are now considered separate species. These strains are the Beet severe curly top virus (BSCTV) and Beet mild curly top virus (BMCTV). So far, the methods of transmission for all three strains seem to be the same.

==== Transmission ====
In order to understand the movement of the MBCTV inside its hosts, experiments have been conducted using PCR analysis which allow for the detection and quantification of MBCTV particles inside leafhoppers. One such study measured the amounts of MBCTV found in the gut, hemocoel and salivary glands of beet leafhoppers and found that the virus was present in all those regions suggesting that the virus may use a circulative transmission mechanism inside its host. A circulative transmission mechanism refers to a transmission mechanism in which the vector ingests a pathogen during feeding from an infected host, the pathogen is absorbed in the vector’s gut and then travels through the hemocoel into the salivary glands. When the vector then bites into an uninfected host, the pathogen enters the new host. This mechanism is similar to the transmission mechanism used by "Spiroplasma citri" in transmitting the Stubborn citrus disease which also uses the beet leafhopper as a vector.

In the same study, researchers were able to detect viral particles of MBCTV in beet leafhopper guts after as soon as an hour of feeding on infected plants. Furthermore, they found that insects that had fed on an infected plant for an hour were able to spread the disease to uninfected plants. These findings suggest that the insects become virulent very shortly after feeding on infected plants. The study also found that as time of feeding on infected plants increased, the numbers of viral particles in the gut, hemocoel and salivary glands of the insects also increased, even though there were individual differences in the amounts of BMCTV particles detected in the body. Another important finding of this study was showing that individual insects can maintain MBCTV in their bodies for up to a 30 days after getting infected by it, even though the amount of virus detected does not increase in this period. The authors propose that this indicates that MBCTV is unable to replicate within its vector. It was also found that the virus is not transmitted between generations of beet leafhoppers from adults to nymphs, proposing that the virus does not use transovarial transmission.

In another study, waveforms from electrical penetration graphs (EPG) were used to understand which waveforms coincided with the inoculation of plants with BCTV. As insects feed on different parts of the plant, they produce different EPG waves which can be measured using probes wired to the insects. Researchers found that D waveforms were most likely to coincide with successful inoculation of the plant with BCTV. This waveform is also the same waveform which is produced during phloem ingestion by beet leafhoppers. Thus, this study further lends credibility to the transmission model that suggests that beet leafhoppers transmit the BCTV when they feed on the phloem sap of healthy plants.

==== Transmission to non-host plants ====
A previous study of oviposition in the beet leafhopper has shown that the insects prefer to lay eggs on beet plants even when they prefer different host plants for feeding. In another study, researchers tried to study which plants the insects prefer to settle and lay eggs on and which plants were good for insect survival. These studies are important as factors like host preference may impact which species of plants the BCTV is transmitted to. It is also important to understand the complex interactions that take place between the beet leafhopper and non-host plants to understand how disease may be spread. Tests of settling behaviors showed that although the insects settled similarly on all plants in the beginning, the numbers of beet leafhoppers on bean and tomato plants declined significantly after a period of four hours. Instead, the insects preferred to settle on sugar beets, radish, potato and carrot plants. These results were similar to studies of insect mortality on the same plants, which showed that the majority of insects confined to bean and tomato plants had died within a week. There were also differences noticed in mortality on plants that were preferred for settling: insects were more likely to die on carrot plants as compared to beets, potato and radish. Experiments on oviposition also showed that the insects had a preference to lay eggs on beet, potato and radish plants where nymphs hatched from eggs and continued providing generations of beet leafhoppers. Carrot, bean and tomato plants were also rejected for oviposition by the insects where no eggs were laid on these plants.

Even though bean and tomato plants proved to be in-hostile hosts for the beet leafhopper, research shows that the insects still transmit the BCTV to these plants. A major implication of this study is that it shows that plants which are inappropriate hosts of the beet leafhopper insect can also be transmitted with the Beet Curly Top Virus. The authors propose that these findings may suggest that the virus can be transmitted very quickly even after only a couple of hours of exposure to the insects.
