= Kompas TV East Java =

Television station in Surabaya, Indonesia

Kompas TV East Java PT Oxcy Media Televisi
- Logo used since 2017

- The Kompas TV East Java region
- Type: Region of television network
- Branding: Kompas TV
- Country: Indonesia
- First air date: July 7, 2009
- Headquarters: Jl. Dukuh Kupang Barat 109/129 Surabaya, East Java
- Broadcast area: East Java
- Owner: PT Cipta Megaswara Televisi (Kompas TV)
- Dissolved: lost on-air identity on 5 November 2012 (now mostly known as Kompas TV except in the morning)
- Former names: BCTV (2009–2012); Kompas TV Surabaya (2012–2017)
- Picture format: 1080i HDTV, downscaled to 16:9 576i for SDTV
- Affiliation: Kompas TV
- Official website: jatim.kompas.tv/%20jatim.kompas.tv
- Language: Indonesian

East Java; Indonesia
- City: Surabaya
- Channels: Digital: 29 UHF, shared with SCTV Surabaya; Virtual: 126

History
- Former channel number: 40 UHF (analog)

Kompas TV East Java (Indonesian: Kompas TV Jawa Timur) (formerly BCTV and Kompas TV Surabaya) is a regional branch of Kompas TV, based in Surabaya. Its studios and transmitter are located in Jl. Dukuh Kupang Barat 109/129 Surabaya, East Java.

== History ==
BC Channel was its name during broadcast tests. It was launched under the name BCTV (an abbreviation of Business Channel Televisi) on 7 July 2009 by PT Oxcy, an advertising agency at Surabaya. This station broadcast on channel 40 UHF, later on 29 UHF. It was intended for its broadcast coverage to gradually include Surabaya, Sidoarjo, Gresik, Lamongan, Pasuruan, Kamal, Bangkalan, and Probolinggo.

After 2 years, profits were not achieved. Operational costs could not be covered by advertising revenues. Because of this, according to the claim of Bambang Purwadi, BCTV opted to cooperate with Kompas Gramedia Group. Bambang Purwadi denied that KG had taken over BCTV's shares.

After the absorption of BCTV into the Kompas TV network, its name changed to Kompas TV Surabaya on 5 November 2012, and to Kompas TV East Java on 20 October 2017. The name only shows in regional programming.

== Coverage area ==
Kompas TV Jawa Timur broadcast in the region of Surabaya, Sidoarjo, Gresik, Lamongan, Pasuruan, Kamal and Bangkalan.

== Programs ==
- Kompas Jawa Timur (Compass East Java)
- Kompas Jatim Sepekan
- Kompas Nusantara
- Sapa Jatim
- Peluang Emas
- Bingkai Hati
- Sentuhan Hati

=== Previous programs ===
- 1001 Surabaya
- Sebelah Mata (Eleven Eyes)
- Stasiun Komedi (Comedy Station)
- I Love Surabaya
- I Love Jatim
