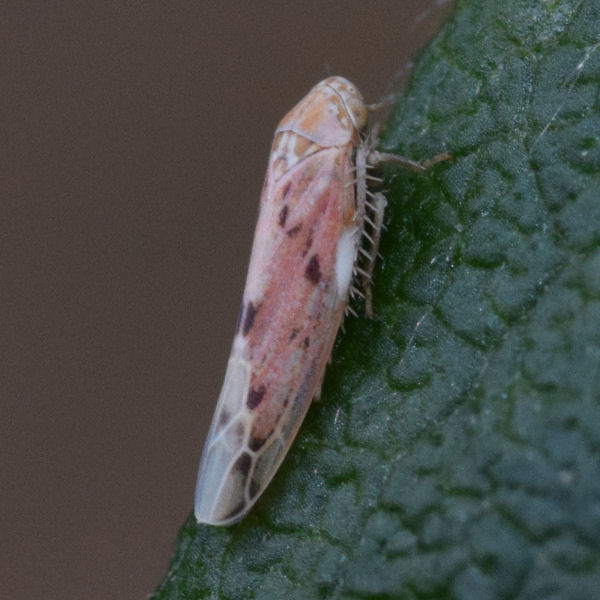
- Balclutha punctata

Scientific classification
- Kingdom: Animalia
- Phylum: Arthropoda
- Clade: Pancrustacea
- Class: Insecta
- Order: Hemiptera
- Suborder: Auchenorrhyncha
- Family: Cicadellidae
- Subfamily: Deltocephalinae
- Tribe: Macrostelini
- Genus: Balclutha; Kirkaldy, 1900

Type species
- Cicada punctata Fabricius, 1775

Synonyms
- List: Agellus DeLong & Davidson, 1933; Anomiana Distant, 1918; Baclutha Kirkaldy, 1900; Balcluta Kirkaldy, 1900; Balcluthina Singh-Pruthi, 1930; Balcutha Kirkaldy, 1900; Balelutha Kirkaldy, 1900; Balilutha Kirkaldy, 1900; Ballutha Kirkaldy, 1900; Egellus DeLong & Davidson, 1933; Eugnathodes Baker, 1903; Eugnathodus Baker, 1903; Eugnathoudus Baker, 1903; Eusceloscopus Evans, 1942; Gnathnodus Fieber, 1866; Gnathodes Fieber, 1866; Gnathodus Fieber, 1866; Gnatodus Fieber, 1866; Gnothodus Fieber, 1866; Grathodus Fieber, 1866; Neosteles Kirkaldy, 1906; Nesosteles Kirkaldy, 1906; Nesostelus Kirkaldy, 1906; Nososteles Kirkaldy, 1906

= Balclutha (leafhopper) =

Genus of insects

Balclutha is a genus of leafhopper that feed on grasses. They have a cosmopolitan distribution with over 100 species. The species feed primarily on grasses and sedges and can shift into cereal crops causing some economic damage especially by transferring plant viruses. The genus is named after Balclutha in Scotland.

Species of the genus Balclutha are small (2-4 mm long) and have the head almost as wide as the pronotum. The anterior margin of the head is rounded when viewed from above. The species can only be distinguished on the basis of male genitalia.

== Species ==
The following species are recognised in the genus Balclutha:

- Balclutha abdominalis (Van Duzee, 1892)
- Balclutha alata Lindberg, 1958
- Balclutha alstoni Knight, 1987
- Balclutha apicula Blocker, 1967
- Balclutha arhenana Dlabola, 1967
- Balclutha aridula Linnavuori, 1959
- Balclutha asymmetrica Knight, 1987
- Balclutha auranticulus (Naudé, 1926)
- Balclutha aurantiigera (Kirkaldy, 1907)
- Balclutha bacchusi Knight, 1987
- Balclutha batuensis Knight, 1987
- Balclutha bidentifurcata Lu & Zhang, 2013
- Balclutha bifasciata (Merino, 1936)
- Balclutha bilobata Knight, 1987
- Balclutha bispinosa Webb & Vilbaste, 1994
- Balclutha boica Wagner, 1950
- Balclutha botelensis Matsumura, 1940
- Balclutha brevis Lindberg, 1954
- Balclutha brownstripa Dai, Li & Chen, 2004
- Balclutha bulbosa Knight, 1987
- Balclutha calamagrostis Ossiannilsson, 1961
- Balclutha caldwelli Blocker, 1967
- Balclutha cheesmanae Knight, 1987
- Balclutha chersonesia Distant, 1917
- Balclutha chiasma Blocker, 1967
- Balclutha chloe (Kirkaldy, 1907)
- Balclutha chloroptera Melichar, 1914
- Balclutha clockstripa Dai, Li et Chen, 2004
- Balclutha cochrani Blocker, 1967
- Balclutha composa Blocker & Nixon, 1978
- Balclutha curvata Caldwell, 1952
- Balclutha delicata (Baker, 1903)
- Balclutha delongi Blocker, 1968
- Balclutha denticula Blocker, 1967
- Balclutha diluta Blocker, 1967
- Balclutha distenda Knight, 1987
- Balclutha distincta Linnavuori, 1959
- Balclutha diversa Blocker, 1967
- Balclutha dufela Webb, 1980
- Balclutha dunaca Webb, 1980
- Balclutha eremica Lindberg, 1958
- Balclutha flagellata Knight, 1987
- Balclutha flavella Linnavuori, 1962
- Balclutha flavescens (Baker, 1903)
- Balclutha flavidella McKamey & Hicks, 2007
- Balclutha frontalis (Ferrari, 1882)
- Balclutha fumigata (Naudé, 1926)
- Balclutha fuscifrons Knight & Webb, 1988
- Balclutha fuscina Blocker, 1967
- Balclutha fuscomaculata Dai, Li & Chen, 2004
- Balclutha gangesiensis Webb & Vilbaste, 1994
- Balclutha grandis Namba, 1956
- Balclutha impicta (Van Duzee, 1892)
- Balclutha incerta (Distant, 1918)
- Balclutha incisa (Matsumura, 1902)
- Balclutha incompta Blocker, 1967
- Balclutha jafara Webb, 1980
- Balclutha knulli (Davidson & DeLong, 1935)
- Balclutha krameri Blocker, 1967
- Balclutha kuroiwae Matsumura, 1914
- Balclutha lineolata (Horváth, 1904)
- Balclutha lobata Namba, 1956
- Balclutha longispina Sun, Zhang, Lu & Webb, 2019
- Balclutha lucida (Butler, 1877)
- Balclutha manitou (Gillette & Baker, 1895)
- Balclutha mexicana Blocker, 1967
- Balclutha mitjajevi Dlabola, 1961
- Balclutha neglecta (DeLong & Davidson, 1933)
- Balclutha nevadensis (Baker, 190)
- Balclutha nicolasi (Lethierry, 1876)
- Balclutha nigriventris Knight & Webb, 1988
- Balclutha nigromaculata (Naudé, 1926)
- Balclutha noonadana Knight, 1987
- Balclutha obunca Blocker, 1967
- Balclutha paralucida Lu & Zhang, 2013)
- Balclutha parapunctata Lu, Zhang & Webb, 2013)
- Balclutha pararubrostriata Rama Subba Rao & Ramakrishnan, 1990
- Balclutha pellucens Horváth, 1909
- Balclutha peregrina (Kirkaldy, 1910)
- Balclutha petrusa Theron, 1973
- Balclutha philippinensis (Merino, 1936)
- Balclutha phoxocephala Namba, 1956
- Balclutha plutonis Kirkaldy, 1910
- Balclutha prasina Jacobi, 1941
- Balclutha punctata (Fabricius, 1775)
- Balclutha rhenana Wagner, 1939
- Balclutha rieki Knight, 1987
- Balclutha robusta (Caldwell, 1952)
- Balclutha rosaceus (Osborn, 1929)
- Balclutha rothi (DeLong & Tsai, 1989)
- Balclutha rubricula (Jacobi, 1941)
- Balclutha rubrinervis (Matsumura, 1902)
- Balclutha rubrostriata (Melichar, 1903)
- Balclutha saltuella (Kirschbaum, 1868)
- Balclutha sandersi (Davidson & DeLong, 1935)
- Balclutha simplex Knight, 1987
- Balclutha sinuata Webb & Vilbaste, 1994
- Balclutha spiniloba Linnavuori, 1960
- Balclutha sternalis (Distant, 1918)
- Balclutha sujawalensis Ahmed, 1986
- Balclutha thaiensis Webb & Vilbaste, 1994
- Balclutha thea (Distant, 1910)
- Balclutha tiaowena Kuoh, 1981
- Balclutha timberlakei (Osborn, 1935)
- Balclutha tricolor (Gmelin, 1789)
- Balclutha tricornis Lu & Zhang, 2013
- Balclutha trilineata Linnavuori, 1960
- Balclutha tumida (Baker, 1903)
- Balclutha uncinata Kuoh, 1987
- Balclutha usitata Namba, 1956
- Balclutha varicolor Distant, 1917
- Balclutha vermiculata (Baker, 1903)
- Balclutha viraktamathi Webb & Vilbaste, 1994
- Balclutha viridinervis Matsumura, 1914
- Balclutha volcanicola (Kirkaldy, 1910)
- Balclutha wilsoni Knight, 1987
- Balclutha woldai Blocker, 1981
- Balclutha yanchepensis (Evans, 1941)
- Balclutha youngi Blocker, 1967
