= Electrical penetration graph =

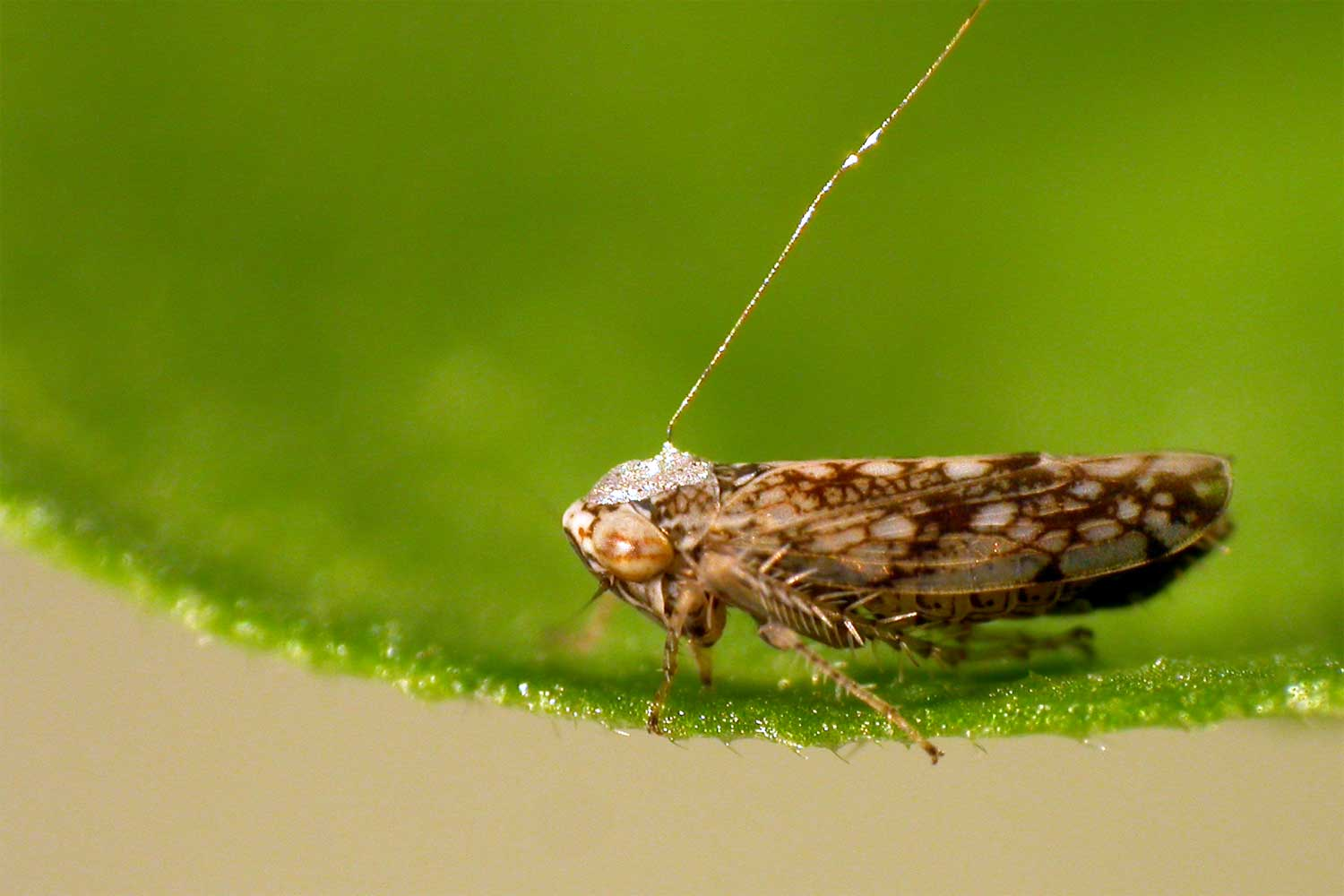
The Common Brown Leafhopper (Orosius orientalis) connected to the EPG electrode

The electrical penetration graph or EPG is a system used by biologists to study the interaction of insects such as aphids, thrips, and leafhoppers with plants. Therefore, it can also be used to study the basis of plant virus transmission, host plant selection by insects and the way in which insects can find and feed from the phloem of the plant. It is a simple system consisting of a partial circuit which is only completed when a species such as aphids, which are the most abundantly studied, inserts its stylet into the plant in order to probe the plant as a suitable host for feeding. The completed circuit is displayed visually as a graph with different waveforms indicating either different insect activities such as saliva excretion or the ingestion of cellular contents or indicating which tissue type has been penetrated (i.e. phloem, xylem or mesophyll). So far, around ten different graphical waveforms are known, correlating with different insect/plant interaction events.

== The Circuit ==
The circuit connects to the insect via a 20 μm gold or platinum wire and to the plant via a copper electrode placed in the soil. The circuit also passes through, normally, a one gigaohm resistor and a 50x amplifier before the results are stored digitally and interpreted by a computer to calculate the final graph.

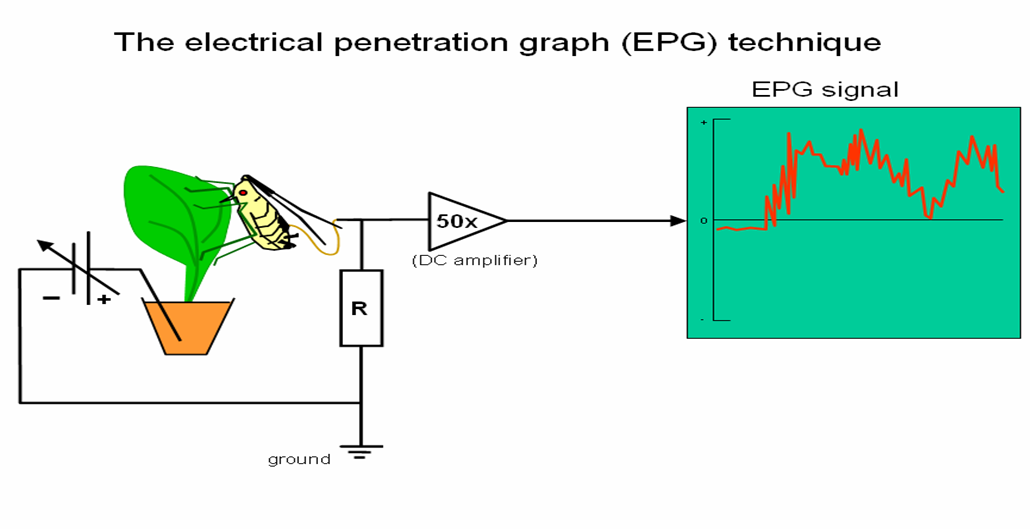

== See also ==
- Plant Viruses
- Epidemiology
- Aphididae
- Insect
