= Cicadulina mbila =

Scientific classification
- Domain: Eukaryota
- Kingdom: Animalia
- Phylum: Arthropoda
- Class: Insecta
- Order: Hemiptera
- Suborder: Auchenorrhyncha
- Family: Cicadellidae
- Genus: Cicadulina
- Species: C. mbila

Binomial name
- Cicadulina mbila Naudé, 1924

Synonyms
- Balclutha mbila Naudé

Species of true bug

Cicadulina mbila, the maize leafhopper, is a leafhopper species in the genus Cicadulina.

It is found in sub-Saharan Africa (Kenya, Tanzania and Uganda), the Middle East, West Asia and India. It is one of the vectors of the maize streak virus.
