= List of grape diseases =

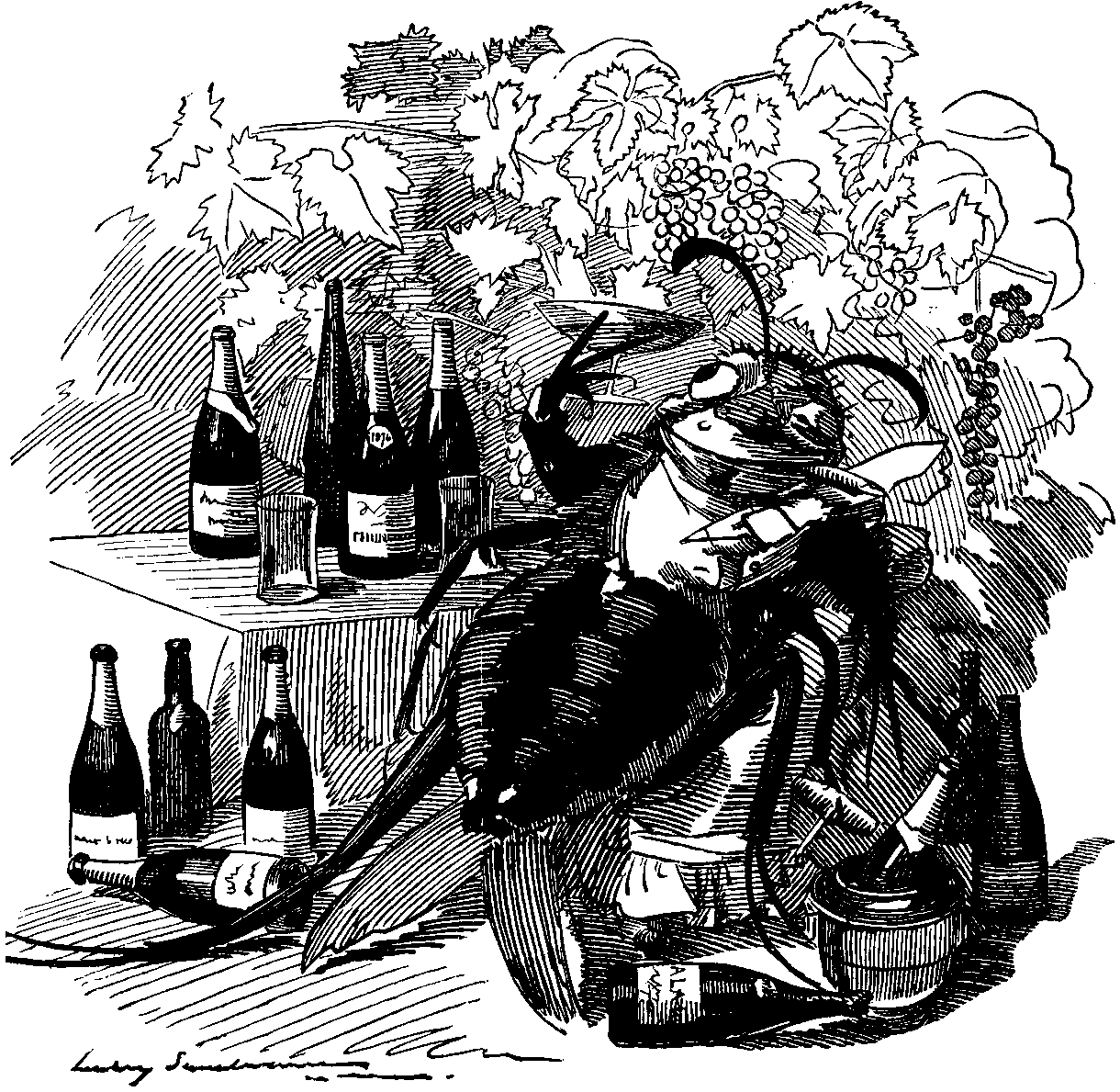
A cartoon from Punch from 1890: The phylloxera, a true gourmet, finds out the best vineyards and attaches itself to the best wines. Punch magazine, 6 Sep. 1890.

This is a list of diseases of grapes (Vitis spp.).

== Bacterial diseases ==
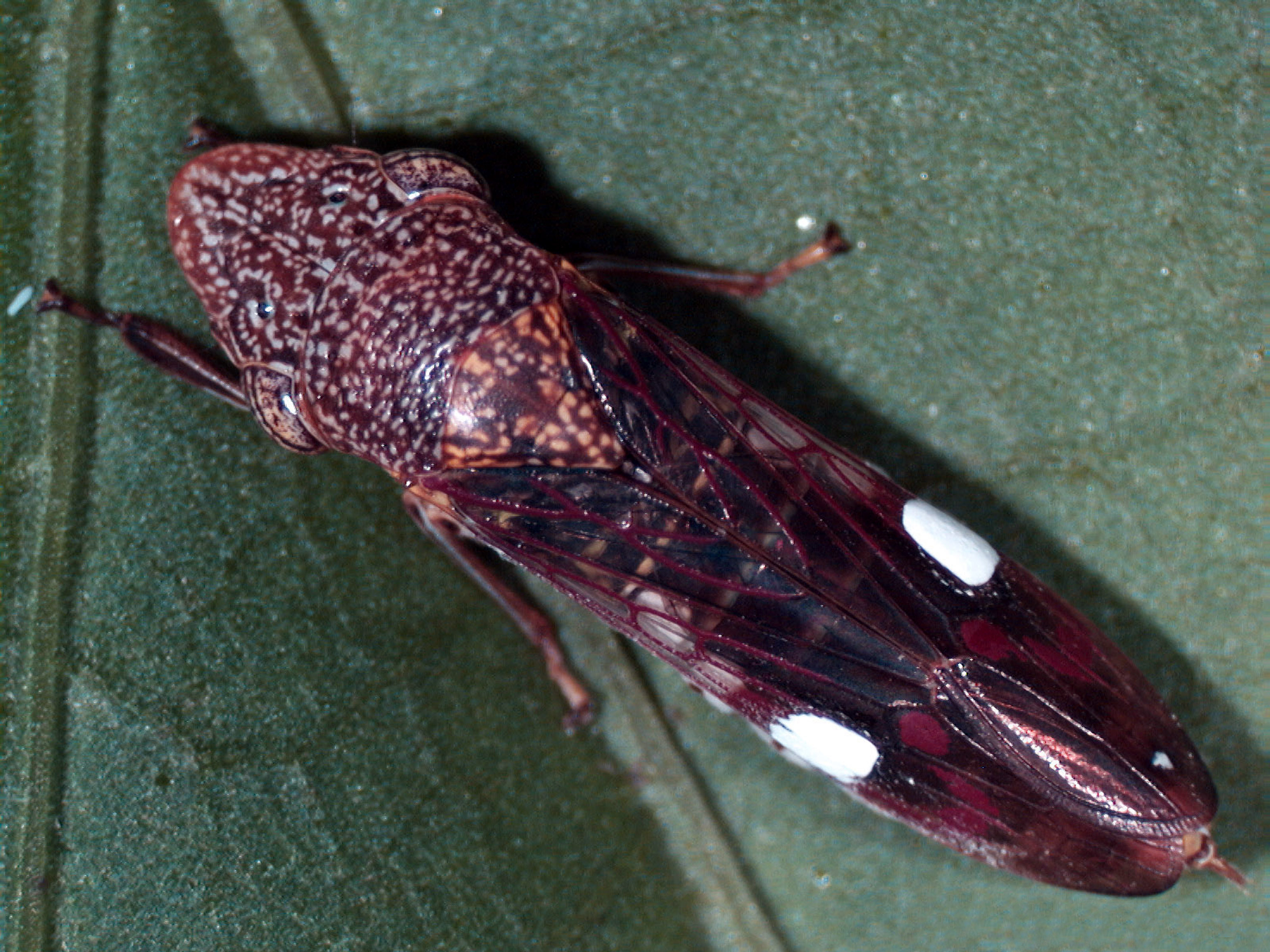
Glassy-winged sharpshooter, the primary carrier of PD

Bacterial diseases
Happy Disease (bacterial necrosis)	Xylophilus ampelinus = Xanthomonas ampelina
Crown gall	Agrobacterium tumefaciens
Pierce's Disease (PD)	Xylella fastidiosa
Bacterial inflorescence rot	Pseudomonas syringae

== Fungal diseases ==
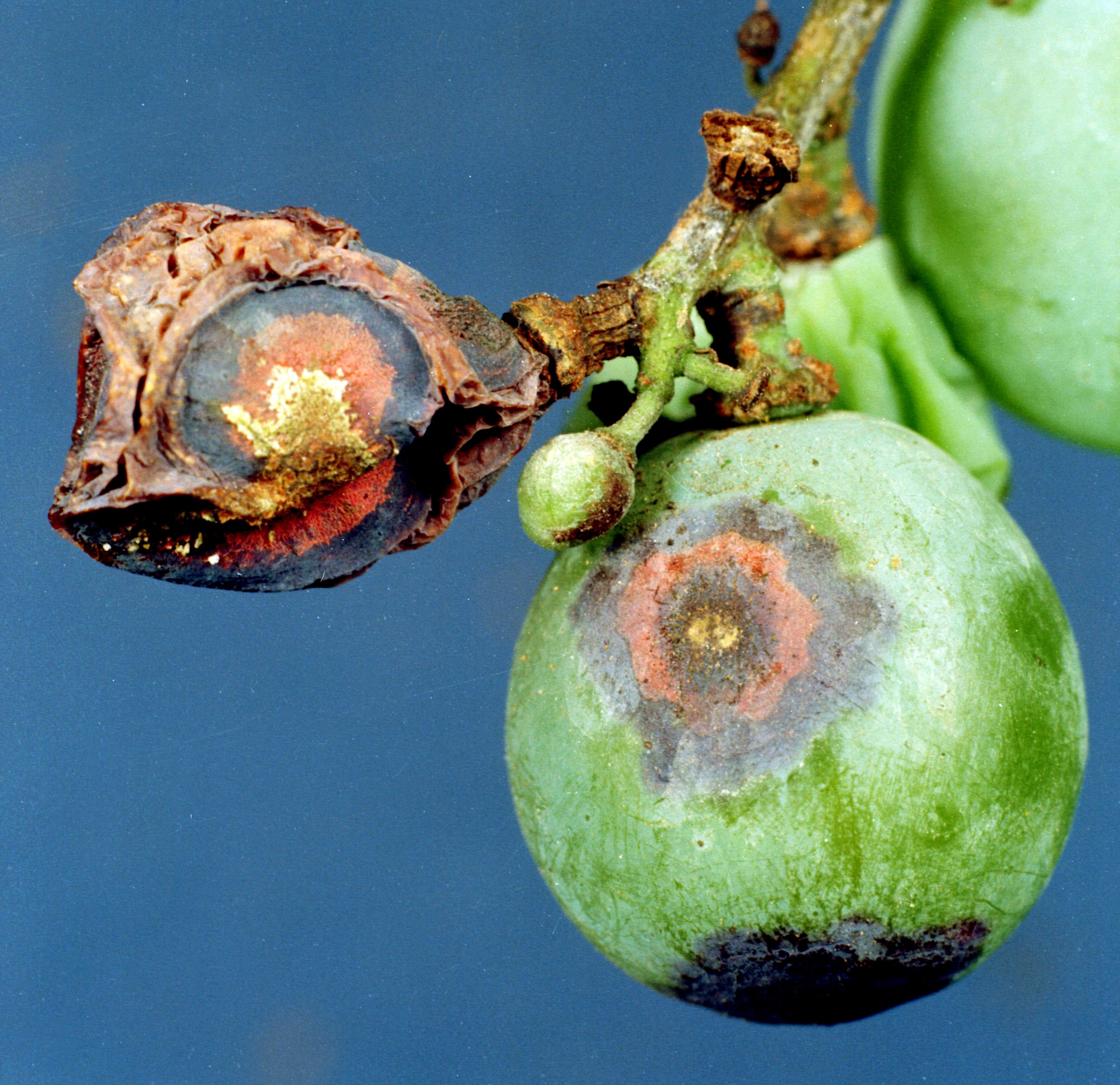
Bird's eye (Anthracnose) rot

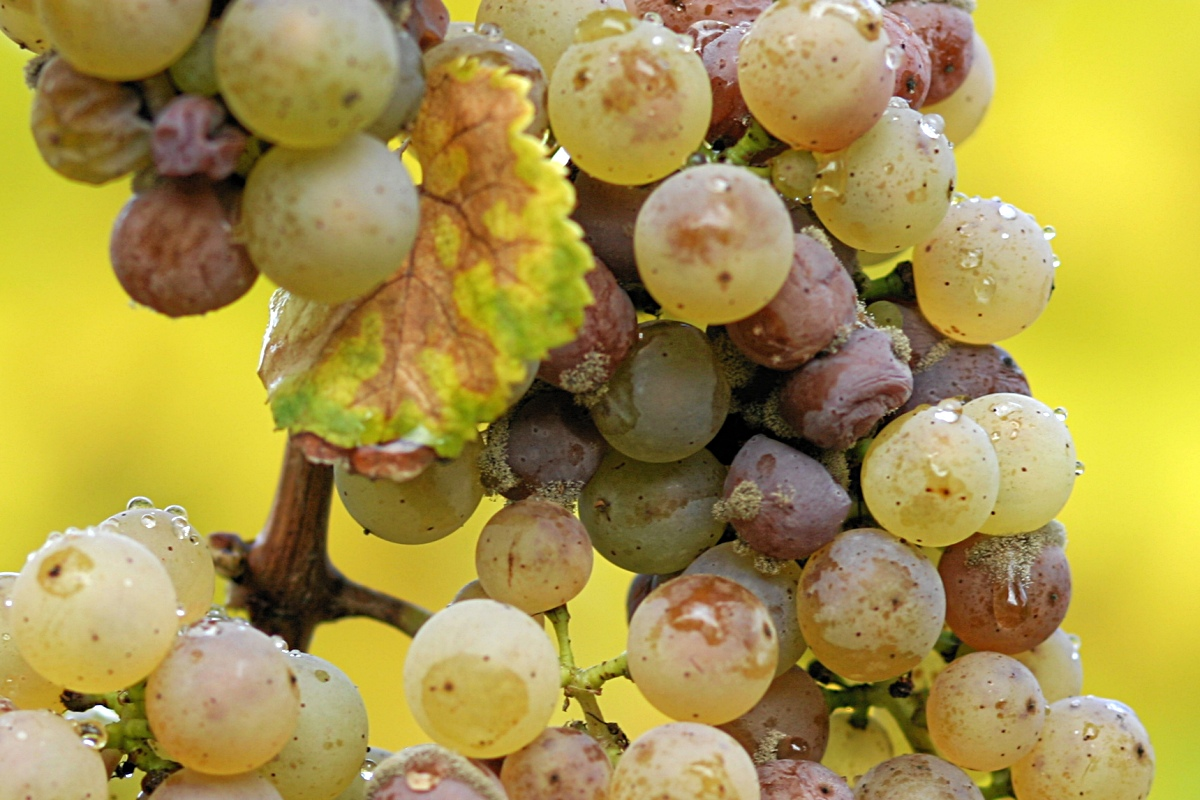
Botrytis or "Noble rot"

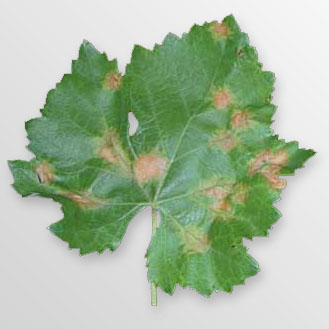
Downy mildew

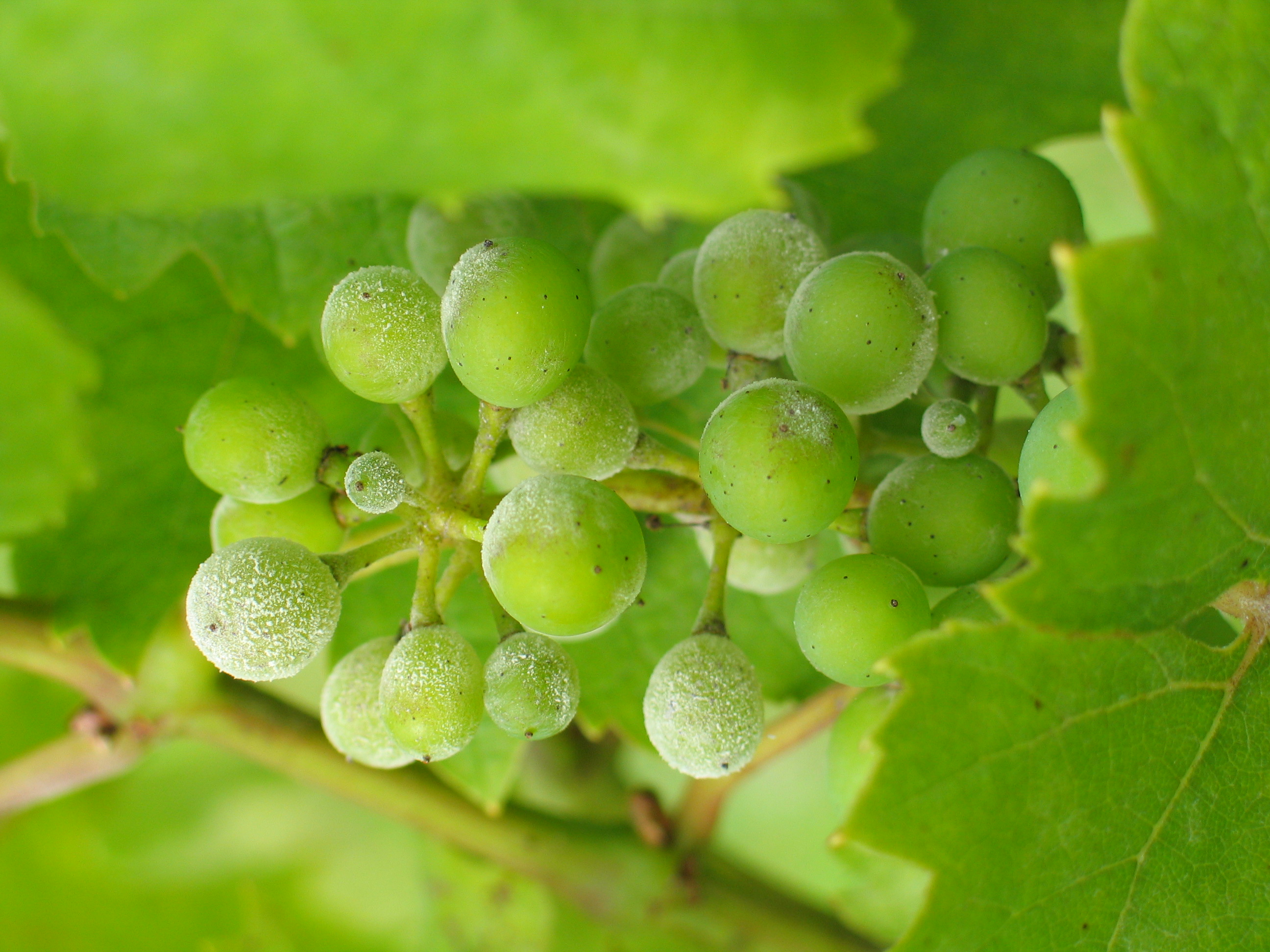
Powdery mildew

Fungal diseases
Alternaria rot	Alternaria alternata
Angular leaf scorch	Pseudopezicula tetraspora Phialophora-type (anamorph)
Angular leaf spot	Mycosphaerella angulata Cercospora brachypus [anamorph]
Anthracnose and bird's-eye rot	Elsinoë ampelina Sphaceloma ampelinum [anamorph]
Armillaria root rot (shoestring root rot)	Armillaria mellea Rhizomorpha subcorticalis [anamorph]
Aspergillus rot	Aspergillus niger
Black rot of grapes	Guignardia bidwellii
Botrytis (Grey Rot or Noble Rot)	Botrytis cinerea
Bot canker	Lasiodiplodia theobromae Botryosphaeria rhodina (anamorph)
Ripe rot	Colletotrichum acutatum species complex: C. fioriniae; C. godetiae; C. citri; C. nymphaeae; Colletotrichum gloeosporioides species complex: C. viniferum; C. gloeosporioides sensu stricto; C. fructicola; C. siamense; C. hebeiense; C. aenigma; C. clidemiae

== Miscellaneous diseases and disorders ==
Miscellaneous diseases and disorders
Berry rot	Yeasts
Black measles	Presumably toxins from wood-rotting fungi; see Wood rot (decay)
Chlorosis	Iron deficiency
Esca (Apoplexy)	Presumably toxins from wood-rotting fungi; see Wood rot (decay)
Fasciation	Genetic disorder
Little leaf	Zinc deficiency
Oxidant stipple	Ozone
Rupestris speckle	Physiological disorder
Stem necrosis (water berry, grape peduncle necrosis)	Physiological disorder

== Nematodes, parasitic ==
Nematodes, parasitic
Citrus	Tylenchulus semipenetrans
Dagger, American	Xiphinema americanum
Dagger	Xiphinema spp. Xiphinema index
Lesion	Pratylenchus spp. Pratylenchus vulnus
Needle	Longidorus spp.
Pin	Paratylenchus hamatus
Reniform	Rotylenchulus spp.
Ring	Mesocriconema xenoplax
Root-knot	Meloidogyne arenaria Meloidogyne hapla Meloidogyne incognita Meloidogyne javanica
Spiral	Helicotylenchus spp.
Stubby-root	Paratrichodorus minor
Stunt	Tylenchorhynchus spp.

== Phytoplasma, virus and viruslike diseases ==
Virus and viruslike diseases
Alfalfa mosaic	Alfalfa mosaic virus
Arabis mosaic	Arabis mosaic virus
Artichoke Italian latent	Artichoke Italian latent virus
Asteroid mosaic	Undetermined, viruslike
Bois noir/black wood disease	Candidatus Phytoplasma solani
Bratislava mosaic	Bratislava mosaic virus
Broad bean wilt	Broad bean wilt virus
Corky bark	Grapevine virus B
Enation	Undetermined, viruslike
Fanleaf degeneration (infectious degeneration and decline)	Grapevine fanleaf virus
Flavescence dorée	MLO
Fleck (Marbrure)	Undetermined, viruslike
Grapevine Bulgarian latent	Grapevine Bulgarian latent virus
Grapevine chrome mosaic	Grapevine chrome mosaic virus
Grapevine red blotch	Grapevine red blotch-associated virus
Grapevine yellows	phytoplasma
Leafroll	Grapevine leafroll-associated viruses (Closteroviridae)
Peach rosette mosaic virus decline	Peach rosette mosaic virus
Petunia asteroid mosaic	Petunia asteroid mosaic virus
Raspberry ringspot	Raspberry ringspot virus
Rupestris stem pitting	Undetermined, viruslike
Shoot necrosis	Undetermined, viruslike
Sowbane mosaic	Sowbane mosaic virus
Strawberry latent ringspot	Strawberry latent ringspot virus
Tobacco mosaic	Tobacco mosaic virus
Tobacco necrosis	Tobacco necrosis virus
Tobacco ringspot virus decline	Tobacco ringspot virus
Tomato black ring	Tomato black ring virus
Tomato ringspot virus decline	Tomato ringspot virus
Vein mosaic	Undetermined, viruslike
Yellow speckle	Viroid

== See also ==
- Ampeloglypter ater
- Ampeloglypter sesostris
- Ampelomyia viticola
- Eupoecilia ambiguella
- Great French Wine Blight
- Japanese beetle
- Maconellicoccus hirsutus
- Otiorhynchus cribricollis
- Paralobesia viteana
- Pseudococcus maritimus
- Pseudococcus viburni
- Zenophassus
