= Xiphinema americanum =

Scientific classification
- Kingdom: Animalia
- Phylum: Nematoda
- Class: Enoplea
- Order: Dorylaimida
- Family: Longidoridae
- Genus: Xiphinema
- Species: X. americanum

Binomial name
- Xiphinema americanum Cobb, (1913)

Species of roundworm

Xiphinema americanum, the American dagger nematode, is a species of plant pathogenic nematodes. It is one of many species that belongs to the genus Xiphinema. It was first described by N. A. Cobb in 1913, who found it on both sides of the United States on the roots of grass, corn, and citrus trees. Not only is Xiphinema americanum known to vector plant viruses, but also X. americanum has been referred to as "the most destructive plant parasitic nematode in America", and one of the four major nematode pests in the Southeastern United States.

== Morphology and anatomy ==
The length of the adult Xiphinema americanum ranges from 1.3 to 3.0 millimeters. The dagger nematode is characterized by a 100 μm odontostyle which is used for deep penetration of root tips with its spear-like stylet. The odontostyle is connected to the lining of the cheilostome by a folded membrane called the "guiding ring". The guiding ring is attached to a flanged odontophore.

Females: The body is usually in an "open C" conformation. The shape of the body tapers towards the extremities. The two rings of the odontophore are located 3 μm apart. The Xiphinema americanum esophagus is dorylaimoid with an enlarged posterior portion that occupies roughly 1/3 of its total length. The esophagus contains a muscular bulb which is 80 μm long and 20 μm wide. The valve between the esophagus and the intestine is amorphous. The vulva is 46-54% of the total body length, and is located equatorially with a transverse slit shape, with the vagina having a diameter of 1/3 of the body diameter. The ovaries normally occur in pairs, and are amphidelphic and relexed. The prerectum of X. americanum measures 120–140 μm long, with a rectum that is roughly the same length as the body diameter at the anus. The tail contains 2-3 pairs of caudal pores, is conoid, and curves dorsally with a subacute terminus.

Males: The males have a similar overall configuration as the females, but are slightly smaller in length. Males of X. americanum, however, are rarely found in nature. The male has diorchic testes that are connected to the cloaca, with one anterior branch and one posterior branch. It is common to find more coil in the posterior region. The males also have paired spicules but lack a gubernaculum and bursa.

== Life cycle ==
Identifying Xiphinema americanum as a separate species has been a difficult task because of overlapping morphological aspects; however, differences in the life cycles of X. americanum may differentiate it from other species. Findings may also suggest that two subgroups of X. americanum should be made due to the finding of either 3 or 4 juvenile stages. The eggs of X. americanum are laid directly into the soil in water films, and are not associated with an egg mass. No molt occurs within the egg, which means that the first stage juvenile is the stage that enters the soil. Before becoming sexually mature adults, the X. americanum nematodes undergo three to four juvenile stages with a molt occurring between each.

Measurements of the functional and replacement odontostyles allows for the determination of the current stage in development. Compounding the issue of determining the life cycle of X. americanum is their difficulty with being grown in culture or greenhouse conditions. It has been suggested that this is due to X. americanum's sensitivity to moisture tension, temperature fluctuation, physical handling, or oxygen deprivation.

Field evidence taken over a 2-year observation period indicates that X. americanum are most likely k-selected; they most likely have a long life span and a low reproduction rate. Unpublished results have shown greenhouse observations of X. americanum to develop from egg to adult in 7 months. Other results have suggested that X. americanum can live as long as 3–5 years.

Reproduction by fertilization from a male is rare if not nonexistent due to the lack of male X. americanum individuals, and therefore females reproduce parthenogenetically. All of the stages of X. americanum occur in the soil, with no particular stage as an important survival stage. In places with low winter temperatures, however, the egg is the primary survival structure.

== Host range ==
X. americanum is a virtually non-specific plant nematode, causing it to have over one hundred different plant hosts. The most common plant hosts infected by X. americanum are common weeds and grasses, strawberries, soybeans, forest trees (spruce, pine, etc.), perennial orchards, and grapes. Although large dagger nematode populations are rare in corn, Xiphinema americanum is the most commonly found dagger nematode species found in the United States, and significant damage can occur when large populations are present early in the growing season. This broad host range is due to the genetic diversity within the X. americanum species. For a complete list of the host range of X. americanum visit the Nemaplex Host Database.

== Distribution ==
Xiphinema americanum is found widely throughout most of the world and is found on all of the continents, except for Antarctica. The region with the highest population of X. americanum is thought to be the Eastern United States. The states with the highest population of the American Dagger Nematode are Arkansas, California, Pennsylvania, Rhode Island and Virginia. Other countries where X. americanum is found include Australia, Belize, Brazil, Chile, Guatemala, India, Japan, Korea Democratic People's Republic, Korea Republic, Mexico, New Zealand, Pakistan, Panama, South Africa, Sri Lanka, Uruguay, and areas of the Caribbean as well.

This species of nematode is also found to be sensitive to soil pH, and they are found most frequently in soils with a pH of 6.0 or higher.

== Feeding habits ==
Xiphinema americanum is a plant parasite that lives entirely in the soil and is attracted to young, growing roots due to source–sink dynamics. These nematodes are migratory ectoparasites and all of the life stages of the American Dagger Nematode feed at the root tips of plants. Since it is a migratory ectoparasite, they remain outside the root or other feeding areas and feed on epidermal cells or on cells deeper in the root. This ectoparasitism allows the nematode to move freely to different hosts throughout its life cycle. This nematode is considered to be an obligate parasite. It can survive within plant debris, however it needs living plant tissue to feed.

Once the nematode arrives at a root tip, it feeds by puncturing several successive layers of the plant's cells with its odontostyle; while penetrating, the nematode secretes enzymes that result in cell hypertrophy and thickening. The nematode is then able to begin extracting the cell's cytoplasm. The feeding period of X. americanum can last anywhere from several hours to several days, with the average being around 36 hours at each feeding site along the plant's roots. While feeding, it is common for the nematodes to remain still with their bodies either outstretched or curled, and following the feeding period they move slowly along the length of the root with their stylet remaining protruded and in search of a new feeding site. Unlike some species of nematodes, the observation of food passing into the gut of X. americanum is not seen. Although the nematodes are non-specific in their Host Range, they generally feed on plants that are in poorer condition for a shorter amount of time.

== Symptoms and economic importance ==
The symptoms that plants exhibit in response to the pathogenicity of Xiphinema americanum are similar to those of other migratory ectoparasitic nematodes of roots. It is common to see poor growth and or stunting of the plant, yellowing or wilting of the foliage, and reduced root systems which can include root necrosis, lack of feeder or secondary roots, and occasional tufts of stubby rootlets.

Young, shortleaved yellow pine trees with moderate swelling of roots with clusters of short, stubby branches were the first demonstration of X. americanum pathogenicity in 1955. X. americanum can also cause severe effects on foliage, sometimes causing chlorosis and complete defoliation as seen on Guatemalan coffee trees. The dagger nematode causes the devitalization of root tips and overall root death when they feed at the root tips and root sides of strawberry plants. Reddish-brown lesions that turn black and necrotic with time result at the sites of feeding, and result in reduced root systems and stunted tops.

In corn, numbers of Xiphinema americanum, have been negatively correlated to yield, and Iowa diagnostic samples from 2000-2010 showed that 6% of submitted corn samples exceeded established damage thresholds of 30-40 individuals per 100 cm³ of soil.

Xiphinema americanum is listed as a C-rated pest in California due to its wide host range of California crops. C-rated pests are widespread, and are of known economic or environmental detriment, according to The California Department of Food and Agriculture. Due to X. americanum's difficulty in maintaining high populations in frequently tilled soils (see Control), the dagger nematode is mainly an economic problem on biennial and perennial crops rather than annual crops (except for damage to emerging seedlings).

== Viral transmission ==
The nematode Xiphinema americanum is an important transmitter of various plant viruses including tomato ringspot nepovirus (TomRSV), tobacco ringspot nepovirus (TRSV), peach rosette mosaic nepovirus (PRMV), and cherry rasp leaf nepovirus (CRLV).

TobRSV is a widespread nepovirus in annual crops in North America that infects tobacco, soybean, blueberry, apple, ash, autumn crocus, blackberry, cherry, dogwood, elderberry, grapevine, spearmint, and in Wisconsin has an economically important impact on cucurbits.

TomRSV is another nepovirus transmitted by X. americanum, and is generally a problem with perennial plants including apple, grapevine, raspberry, strawberry, birdsfoot-trefoil, dogwood, elderberry, hydrangeas, orchids, and red currants. It is also a problem some annual plants including tomato and cucumber.

Apple, cherry, and peach trees in the Pacific coast states of the United States are infected by CRLV.

PRMV causes substantial damage to Prunus spp., grapevine, and blueberry in the Great Lakes area.

Much like the broad host range of X. americanum, the 4 nepoviruses transmitted by this nematode do as well. They also have the capability of dissemination in wind-blown seeds as well as remaining harbored in natural reservoirs including weeds.

In parallel tests, TomRSV has been shown to transmit more efficiently than TRSV. Primarily, the viruses reside in the regions of the stylet extension, the anterior esophageal lumen, and rarely in the esophageal bulb. TRSV has been shown to prefer the areas of the stylet extension and anterior esophageal lumen, whereas the TomRSV is found mainly in the triradiate lumen of the esophageal bulb. The different locations of viral binding sites for TRSV and TomRSV account for the capability of dual transmission of both viruses, because the different viruses are not competing for binding sites. TRSV particles can be liberated into the plant during feeding by the dorsal and subventral gland secretions. TomRSV is mainly liberated by the secretions of the subventral glands due to its location in the triradiate lumen. These facts may account for the differences in the experimentally determined transformation efficiency between TomRSV (100%), and TRSV (75% or less). Previous work attempting to identify virus binding sites and release was difficult without the development of immunofluorescent labeling.

== Control ==
Control of the American Dagger Nematode presents problems because X. americanum is hard to completely remove. Nematicides generally remove up to 95% of the nematodes in soil, however the 5% that remain can reproduce asexually and the viruses that they carry can still infect the roots of young plants. Therefore, to eliminate the nematodes, nematicides should be used along with having a bare soil field for at least a 2-year period. This ensures that the X. americanum has no food source. At the end of this 2-year period the nematodes should be eradicated.

The spraying of nematicides also causes plants to release allelopathic chemicals. These chemicals then kill the nematodes by active suppression because they are toxic to the nematode. Crop rotation is another form of control for X. americanum. It has been shown that certain non-host plants may deny the nematode population an adequate food source for reproduction, and thus greatly reduce its population in the soil. This is termed passive suppression.

Xiphinema americanum can only travel via run-off and in damp soil, therefore if soils are kept dry enough the nematodes can be localized and quarantined.

Additionally, if soil is tilled frequently, X. americanum will likely not be in high enough of a population density to cause any noticeable symptoms in its hosts. There is also evidence of X. americanum resistance and "tolerance" seen in certain species of grapes that appeared to be better adapted to the parasite.
