= Ringspot =

Ringspot, a symptom of various plant viral infections, may refer to:

- Carnation ringspot virus, plant pathogenic virus of the family Tombusviridae
- Hydrangea ringspot virus, plant pathogenic virus of the family Flexiviridae
- Odontoglossum ringspot virus, plant pathogenic virus
- Papaya ringspot virus, plant pathogenic virus in the genus Potyvirus and the virus family Potyviridae
- Potato black ringspot virus, plant pathogenic virus of the family Comoviridae
- Prunus necrotic ringspot virus, plant pathogenic virus of the family Bromoviridae
- Raspberry ringspot virus, plant pathogenic virus of the family Comoviridae
- Strawberry latent ringspot virus, plant pathogenic virus of the family Comoviridae
- Tobacco ringspot virus, plant pathogenic virus in the plant virus family Comoviridae
- Tomato ringspot virus, plant pathogenic virus of the family Comoviridae
