= Cocoa necrosis virus =

Virus classification
- (unranked): Virus
- Realm: Riboviria
- Kingdom: Orthornavirae
- Phylum: Pisuviricota
- Class: Pisoniviricetes
- Order: Picornavirales
- Family: Secoviridae
- Genus: Nepovirus
- Species: Nepovirus theobromatis

Synonyms
- Cacao necrosis virus

Species of virus

Cocoa necrosis virus (CoNV) is a plant pathogenic virus of the genus Nepovirus that infects Theobroma cacao en natura causing cacao necrosis disease. CoNV is considered synonymous with Strain S of cacao swollen shoot virus. Unlike Cacao swollen shoot virus, it is not transmitted by mealybugs nor vectored by aphids, beetles, or leafhoppers that also commonly infest cacao. Serologically, it is distantly related to Tomato black ring virus and very distantly related to Grapevine chrome mosaic virus.

== Hosts and symptoms ==
Cacao necrosis virus is restricted to systemic infection of Theobroma cacao in nature. Symptoms on cacao include an acute stage showing translucent veinal necrosis of leaves, necrotic or chlorotic spots of leaves, defoliation, and dieback of shoots that rarely leads to seedling death if infected by the Ghanaian isolate. A following recovery phase of live plants shows limited leaf symptoms.

The virus has been transmitted to numerous diagnostically susceptible host species including Beta vulgaris, Chenopodium amaranticolor, Chenopodium quinoa, Cucumis sativus, Glycine max, Gomphrena globosa, Nicotiana clevelandii, Nicotiana glutinosa, Nicotiana tabacum, Petunia × hybrida, Phaseolus vulgaris, Tetragonia tetragonioides, Theobroma cacao, and Vigna unguiculata, but these plants are not infected in nature. The strain used to infect these species was the Ghanaian isolate. Three of these species displayed characteristic symptoms: P. vulgaris cv. The Prince, Beta vulgaris cv. Greentop, and Chenopodium quinoa. P. vulgaris develops chlorotic rings 4–5 days post inoculation on the primary leaf site, followed by veinal chlorotic mottling on systemic infection of trifoliate leaves. B. vulgaris displays red rings to the inoculated leaves 10 days post infection without systemic infection. C. quinoa displays severe tip necrosis 10–12 days post inoculation without systemic infection.

Indexing of the disease occurs when a rootstock is grafted onto a susceptible cacao cultivar and then the plant is examined for symptom development.

== Disease cycle ==
Specificity in the life cycle of cacao necrosis virus, in contrast to other plant pathogenic viral pathogens, has not yet been studied. The virus is assigned to the genus Nepovirus and is most likely transmitted by needle nematodes (Longidorus spp.). Once the virus is inside the plant cell, viral RNA is released into the cytoplasm. The RNA is duplicated in viroplasms. A double stranded RNA (dsRNA) genome is created from single stranded RNA (ssRNA). The transcribed dsRNA creates new messenger RNAs and ssRNA genomes. This allows for assembly of new viruses in the viroplasms. The new viruses are encapsulated in newly synthesized proteins which are able to facilitate transport from the infected cell to other cells.

== Environment ==
Nematode vectors are responsible for transmission. Conditions that favor nematodes will also favor the spread of cacao necrosis virus including moistened soil and mild temperatures. Longidorus spp. has been found in soils of surrounding cacao necrosis disease outbreaks in Ghana, and are seemingly the genus of nematodes involved with transmission. These are root ectoparasites. The pathogen is not soil or air borne, as viruses are obligate parasites.

== Management ==
There is no treatment for plants once infected with cacao necrosis virus. Destruction of infected and contact cacao trees is an effective cultural control method. This does not prevent new spread although spread is greatly reduced due to the limited dispersal of the nematode vector and subsequent monocyclic cycle of disease No resistant strains have been produced, though a resistant cacao tree may be the best possible management option looking forward. A similar transgenic approach taken to combat papaya ringspot virus could work for cacao based on the type of vector transmission. Seed transmission is estimated to be up to 24% depending on the plant species so cacao plantations should be planted from clean seed stock.

== Importance ==
This disease is currently found in Colombia, Venezuela, Ghana, Nigeria, Sri Lanka, and Indonesia. It is widespread in Ghana and Nigeria. Ghana, Indonesia, and Nigeria are in the top five cacao producing countries in the world, and cacao is one of the main and among the most economically important exports in these regions. Withal, the disease has no apparent economic impact to these countries or the chocolate industry as outbreaks are small, localized, and easily controlled by eradication. The disease was first described and partially characterized in papers published in 1948 and 1972, respectively. Most of the research into this pathogen has historically been done in Ghana and Nigeria. Not much has been done to study the disease in recent years.

== Pathogenesis ==
The virions are isometric and not enveloped. They have a diameter of 24-26 nm. and are considered either angular or hexagonal in profile subject to the suspension material the virus is observed in. The virion differs from traditional Nepovirus characteristics by fractioning into empty protein shells and particles of 12 nm. in diameter when fractionated without butanol. The virions are also slightly heavier than that of other Nepoviruses at 60,000 daltons.

The exact mechanism of pathogenesis for cacao necrosis virus is not yet understood. The virus is not infective in sap after heating to 65 °C for 10 minutes, dilution to 0.0001 virions, or storage for 7 days at room temperature.

== Sources ==
- Brunt, A. A. (1984). "Cacao necrosis nepovirus". Plant Viruses Online. Archived from the original on 25 November 2015.
- End, Michelle J.; Daymond, Andrew J. & Hadley, Paul (2010). Technical guidelines for the safe movement of cacao germplasm (PDF). pp. 22–23. ISBN 978-9290438717.
- Harris, Kerry F.; Maramorosch, Karl, eds. (1980). Vectors of Plant Pathogens. New York: Academic Press. p. 377. ISBN 978-0123264503.
- Hughes, Jacqueline d'A. & Odu, Babajide O. (2003). "Plant Virology in Sub-Saharan Africa: Proceedings of a Conference Organized by IITA : 4-8 June 2001, International Institute of Tropical Agriculture, Ibadan, Nigeria". Plant Virology in Sub-Saharan Africa: Proceedings of a Conference Organized by IITA. Ibadan, Nigeria: International Institute of Tropical Agriculture. ISBN 978-9781312144.
- Jones, F. G. W.; Larbey, D. W. & Parrott, Diana M. (1969). "The influence of soil structure and moisture on nematodes, especially xiphinema, longidorus, trichodorus and heterodera spp". Soil Biology and Biochemistry. 1 (2): 153–165. Bibcode:1969SBiBi...1N5159J. doi:10.1016/0038-0717(69)90006-6.
- Kenten, R. H. (1972). "The purification and some properties of cocoa necrosis virus, a serotype of tomato black ring virus". Annals of Applied Biology. 71 (2): 119–126. doi:10.1111/j.1744-7348.1972.tb02946.x.
- Kenten, R. H. (1977). "Cacao necrosis virus". Description of Plant Viruses. Rothamsted Research.
- Owusu, G. K. (1971). "Cocoa necrosis virus in Ghana". Tropical Agriculture. 48 (2): 133–139.
- "Cocoa necrosis virus". PlantwisePlus Knowledge Bank 11789. 22 November 2019. doi:10.1079/pwkb.species.11789.
- "Nepovirus". ViralZone. Swiss Institute of Bioinformatics.
- "Top 10 Cocoa Producing Countries". WorldAtlas.
