= Blueberry leaf mottle virus =

Virus classification
- (unranked): Virus
- Realm: Riboviria
- Kingdom: Orthornavirae
- Phylum: Pisuviricota
- Class: Pisoniviricetes
- Order: Picornavirales
- Family: Secoviridae
- Genus: Nepovirus
- Species: Nepovirus myrtilli

Species of virus

Blueberry leaf mottle virus (BLMV) is a Nepovirus that was first discovered in Michigan in 1977. It has also appeared in New York, eastern Canada, Bulgaria, Hungary, and Portugal.

== Structure ==
The BLMV genome is bipartite containing two segmented regions of linear, positive-sense, single stranded RNA. The entire genome of the virus is 14600 nucleotides long, and the RNA-1 has a partially sequenced region that is 7600 nucleotides long. The virus consists of a naked, icosahedral capsid that is 28 nm in diameter. The genome of the virus codes for both structural and non-structural proteins, and the lipids of this virus are unknown.

== Strains of the virus ==
There are currently three known strains of Blueberry leaf mottle virus. The original strain (BLMV) infects highbush and lowbush varieties in Michigan and eastern Canada. A second strain (BLMV-NY) has only been reported in one case in New York and infected an American grapevine. The third strain was discovered in Bulgarian grapevines and is known as the grapevine Bulgarian latent nepovirus. Grapevines with this strain are asymptomatic.

== Hosts ==
The primary host of BLMV is the highbush blueberry (Vaccinium corymbosum). Other hosts include lowbush blueberry types (V. angustifolium and V. myrtilloides), hybrids of highbush and lowbush blueberry types (V. corymbosum x V.angutifolium), American grapevines (Vitis labrusca), and Bulgarian grapevines (Vitis vinifera).

== Symptoms ==
Symptoms of BLMV include malformed, mottled leaves that are pale green in color and have smaller than healthy leaves. The leaves may also have transparent spots that are visible when they are held up to the light. Bushes may be stunted and if bushes are badly infected, they may show dieback of stems with little regrowth. Symptoms do not appear until three to four years after infection.

== Transmission ==
Unlike many nepoviruses, BLMV does not appear to have a nematode vector and is instead spread by honeybees during pollination via infected pollen. The virus can also be seedborne in seedlings of an infected bush although this is somewhat rare and has only happened in 1.5% of reported BLMV cases.

== Prevention ==
There is no known treatment for BLMV and prevention is the best method of control. Blueberry bushes should be planted only if they are approved by legitimate virus-testing programs, especially in areas where the virus has been reported. Other blueberry bushes that have already been infected should be identified by ELISA and destroyed completely so that they do not grow back and risk infecting other bushes. It is also recommended, since honeybees spread the virus, that all honeybee hives should not be placed anywhere near infected bushes.

== See also ==
- Blueberry shoestring virus
- Tobacco ringspot virus
