= Cherry leaf roll virus =

Virus classification
- (unranked): Virus
- Realm: Riboviria
- Kingdom: Orthornavirae
- Phylum: Pisuviricota
- Class: Pisoniviricetes
- Order: Picornavirales
- Family: Secoviridae
- Genus: Nepovirus
- Species: Cherry leaf roll virus

Synonyms
- Ash mosaic virus; Elm mosaic; Sambucus ringspot and yellow net virus; Walnut blackline disease

Species of virus

Cherry leaf roll virus (CLRV) is a plant pathogenic virus of the subfamily Comovirinae, family Secoviridae, order Picornavirales.

== Hosts ==
The Cherry leaf roll virus infects a wide variety of woody plants and produces different symptoms by host. Symptoms of infection were first identified in walnut and sweet cherry trees. The virus is known to infect at least 36 plant families and natural hosts include olive, elm, ash, elderberry, beech, rhubarb, dogwood, and lilac.

== Symptoms ==
Symptoms include leaf roll, leaf yellowing, early dropping of leaves, stunted growth, and plant dieback. Plants can also be infected without exhibiting symptoms.
