= Broad bean wilt virus 1 =

Virus classification
- (unranked): Virus
- Realm: Riboviria
- Kingdom: Orthornavirae
- Phylum: Pisuviricota
- Class: Pisoniviricetes
- Order: Picornavirales
- Family: Secoviridae
- Genus: Fabavirus
- Species: Fabavirus alphaviciae

Species of virus

Broad bean wilt virus 1 (BBWVI) is a plant pathogenic virus of the order Picornavirales, family Secoviridae, subfamily Comovirinae, genus Fabavirus.

== Description ==
BBWV was first isolated from broad beans (Vicia faba) in Australia in 1947, and is transmitted by aphids. Despite its name, BBWV has a wide range of hosts including both monocotyledons and dicotyledons, but mainly the latter. By 1991 177 species in 39 families had been reported as being infected with BBWV. These include perennial bulbous ornamentals such as Narcissus tazetta.

== Taxonomy ==
Broad bean wilt virus 1 is one of two similar species (BBWV) of a total of seven in the genus Fabavirus, the other being Broad bean wilt virus 2. Proposed as a member of the Fabavirus group in 1987, its current taxonomic status was established in 2009 in the 9th report of the ICTV.

== Bibliography ==
- King, Andrew M. Q.; et al., eds. (2012). Virus taxonomy : classification and nomenclature of viruses : ninth report of the International Committee on Taxonomy of Viruses. London: Academic Press. p. 926. ISBN 978-0123846846.
- "Virus Taxonomy: 2013 Release". International Committee on Taxonomy of Viruses (ICTV). 2014.
- V. Lisa; G. Boccardo (1996). "Fabaviruses". In Murant, A.F.; Harrison, B.D. (eds.). The Plant Viruses Polyhedral Virions and Bipartite RNA Genomes. Boston, MA: Springer US. pp. 229–250. doi:10.1007/978-1-4899-1772-0_9. ISBN 978-1-4899-1772-0.
- IWAKI, Mitsuro; KOMURO, Yasuo (1972). "Viruses Isolated from Narcissus (Narcissus spp.) in Japan". Japanese Journal of Phytopathology. 38 (2): 137–145. doi:10.3186/jjphytopath.38.137.
