= Strawberry latent ringspot virus =

Virus classification
- (unranked): Virus
- Realm: Riboviria
- Kingdom: Orthornavirae
- Phylum: Pisuviricota
- Class: Pisoniviricetes
- Order: Picornavirales
- Family: Secoviridae
- Genus: Stralarivirus
- Species: Stralarivirus fragariae

Synonyms
- Aesculus line pattern virus; Rhubarb virus 5; SLRSV; Strawberry latent ringspot virus(ICTV -2021); Stralarivirus SLRSV (ICTV 2021); Stralarivirus fragariae (ICTV 2022)

Species of virus

Strawberry latent ringspot virus (SLRSV), different form, is a plant pathogenic virus of the genus Stralarivirus with its primary host of Fragaria × ananassa (strawberry). The virus is transmitted primarily by nematodes and has been detected primarily in Europe, but has some presence on other continents.

Originally classified as a Sadwavirus, then a Nepovirus, after genomic sequencing it (alongside other related viruses) was assigned a new genus Stralarivirus.

== Host range and distribution ==
The primary host is the cultivated Fragaria × ananassa (strawberry), but infections have also been reported in Ribes nigrum (blackcurrant), Rubus idaeus (raspberry), Aesculus hippocastanum (horse chestnut), and Rheum rhabarbarum (rhubarb). The virus is present across Europe, North America, New Zealand, and parts of Asia.

== Transmission and epidemiology ==
SLRSV is transmitted by nematodes in the genus Xiphinema, notably Xiphinema diversicaudatum, in a semi-persistent manner. It can also be spread by infected propagation material and mechanically through contaminated tools.

== Symptoms and detection ==
In strawberries, infection is often latent and symptomless. When symptoms occur, they may include mottling, leaf deformation, or reduced vigor, depending on cultivar and environmental conditions. Additionally, infections often occur in mixed infections alongside other pathogenic plant viruses.

A variety of laboratory detection methods for SLRSV exist, including enzyme-linked immunosorbent assay (ELISA) and reverse-transcription polymerase chain reaction (RT-PCR). Commercial ELISA kits are widely used for screening strawberry stock plants. RNA-based molecular assays are also used to confirm infections and distinguish SLRSV from other Secoviridae members.

== Management and importance ==
SLRSV infection can cause plant damage and yield reduction in infected produce, primarily strawberries. Its capability to remain latent can hinder large scale agriculture and nursery programs. Additionally, the virus may remain latent in non-crop hosts/other crops which makes proper containment difficult.

Common pomological certification is conducted by isolating and maintaining a stock of pure samples which are regularly checked for infection. As the virus is reliant on nematodes it is reliant on already infected plants and soil to spread, so hygiene and testing can ensure a safe crop. This method has the added benefit of screening for other similar diseases such as Arabis mosaic virus.
