= Arabis mosaic virus =

Virus classification
- (unranked): Virus
- Realm: Riboviria
- Kingdom: Orthornavirae
- Phylum: Pisuviricota
- Class: Pisoniviricetes
- Order: Picornavirales
- Family: Secoviridae
- Genus: Nepovirus
- Species: Nepovirus arabis

Isolates
- Arabis mosaic virus-butterbur; Arabis mosaic virus-lilac; Arabis mosaic virus-lily; Arabis mosaic virus-Lv; Arabis mosaic virus-MD; Arabis mosaic virus-narcissus; Arabis mosaic virus - NW; Arabis mosaic virus - P2; Arabis mosaic virus-Ta

Synonyms
- Ash ring and line pattern virus; Forsythia yellow net virus; Raspberry yellow dwarf virus; Rhubarb mosaic virus

Species of virus

Arabis mosaic virus is a viral plant pathogen that is known to infect multiple hosts. The pathogen, commonly referred to as ArMV, is from the family Secoviridae, and it causes yellow dwarf of raspberry and is one of the causes of mosaic of rhubarb. Arabis mosaic virus infects multiple hosts, including strawberries, hops, hemp, grape, geraniums, raspberries, sugar beets, celery, horseradish, lilac, peach, and lettuces.

== Symptoms ==
While it is common for the hosts not to show any symptoms of the pathogens influence, there are some symptoms that can occur in the hosts. The most prevalent symptoms of the ArMV are stunting of the plant and leaf flecking/molting and leaf enations. The symptoms will vary based on the type of rootstock, environmental conditions and variety.

== Disease cycle ==
This virus is transmitted mainly through the soil by nematodes, but it can also be transmitted by arthropods (such as insects), and through seed and pollen transmission. Nepoviruses are transmitted through three different genera of nematodes: Xiphinema Longidorus, and Paralongidorus. For Arabis mosaic virus, Xiphinema diversicaudatum is the most common nematode vector. In this cycle, females lay their eggs in the spring, which then hatch and the juveniles mature through four different stages (which can be distinguished by body length and functionality of odontostyles) and finally move into adulthood. Nematodes feed on the roots of the infected plants, taking up the virus with them as they do and allowing for the virus to travel between plants. The nematodes can only transmit the virus when they are adults, but once they molt they have to re-uptake the virus from an infected root in order for them to pass it on again.

== Management ==
The best way to control the virus is to use virus-free planting material. The pathogen can only be transmitted through soils where the pathogen already exists and nematodes are present, so when proper hygienic techniques and sterile materials are used the crops will be virus free. It is also important to test the soil where plants had previously been infected to make sure there are no nematodes that are remaining in the soil. These measures are all that is being used so far because nematicides are not able to reduce the nematode presence, as the nematodes are able to reside deep within the soil in the roots of the plants.
