= Cassava American latent virus =

Virus classification
- (unranked): Virus
- Realm: Riboviria
- Kingdom: Orthornavirae
- Phylum: Pisuviricota
- Class: Pisoniviricetes
- Order: Picornavirales
- Family: Secoviridae
- Genus: Nepovirus
- Virus: Cassava American latent virus

Pathogenic virus

Cassava American latent virus (CsAlV) is a plant pathogenic virus of the family Secoviridae. It was discovered by Walter et al., 1989.

== Range ==
Brazil and Guyana.
