= Strawberry mottle virus =

Virus classification
- (unranked): Virus
- Realm: Riboviria
- Kingdom: Orthornavirae
- Phylum: Pisuviricota
- Class: Pisoniviricetes
- Order: Picornavirales
- Family: Secoviridae
- Genus: Sadwavirus
- Subgenus: Stramovirus
- Species: Sadwavirus fragariae

Synonyms
- Strawberry mild crinkle virus

Species of virus

Strawberry mottle virus (SMV) is a pathogenic plant virus in Secoviridae, a family of plant-infecting picornaviruses. It is not yet assigned to a genus. Virions are isometric, approximately 28 nm in diameter, and contain two RNA strands (RNA1 and RNA2) equal to about 12,600 nucleotides in length. The polyprotein of RNA1 contains regions identified as helicase, protease, RNA-dependent RNA polymerase and a viral genome-linked protein while RNA2 shows similarities to the large coat protein domain of the Satsuma dwarf virus.
