= Potato virus U =

Virus classification
- (unranked): Virus
- Realm: Riboviria
- Kingdom: Orthornavirae
- Phylum: Pisuviricota
- Class: Pisoniviricetes
- Order: Picornavirales
- Family: Secoviridae
- Genus: Nepovirus
- Species: Nepovirus usolani

Species of virus

Potato virus U (PVU) is a pathogenic plant virus discovered in Peru in 1983. PVU characteristically causes leaf malformation and necrotic spotting. Transmitted by mechanical inoculation—including seed-to-seed contact and grafting—PVU is also said to be transferred by nematodes of the genus Longidorus.
