= Cherry rasp leaf virus =

Virus classification
- (unranked): Virus
- Realm: Riboviria
- Kingdom: Orthornavirae
- Phylum: Pisuviricota
- Class: Pisoniviricetes
- Order: Picornavirales
- Family: Secoviridae
- Genus: Cheravirus
- Species: Cheravirus avii

Synonyms
- flat apple virus

Species of virus

Cherry rasp leaf virus (CRLV) is a plant pathogenic virus of the order Picornavirales, family Secoviridae, genus Cheravirus.

== Causes ==
CRLV can be transmitted by nematode (Xiphinema Americana), mechanical inoculation, grafting, or seed (10–20%).

== Symptoms ==
Leaves become studded with projections or enations between the lateral veins and all along the midrib. As a result, the leaves become deformed and folded, looking very narrow. The face of the leaf has a bumpy texture as a result of the enations on the underside.

Initial infections begin at the lower branches and patches of the tree will show symptoms. Lateral (tree-to-tree) infection is slow and fruit production is reduced. Severe infection may result in the death of the tree.
