= Xiphinema insigne =

Scientific classification
- Kingdom: Animalia
- Phylum: Nematoda
- Class: Enoplea
- Order: Dorylaimida
- Family: Longidoridae
- Genus: Xiphinema
- Species: X. insigne

Binomial name
- Xiphinema insigne Loos, 1949

Species of roundworm

Xiphinema insigne is a plant pathogenic nematode infecting tea. They are known to infect cacao trees.

== Distribution ==
They are known to live in the Philippines. It also resides in China, where it is the most common of all of the Xiphinema nematodes.

== Characteristics ==
There is a great deal of interspecies variation within the Xiphinema insigne population, generally variations are due to, or at least correlate with, geographical or climate differences.

== See also ==
- List of tea diseases
