= Lucerne Australian latent virus =

Virus classification
- (unranked): Virus
- Realm: Riboviria
- Kingdom: Orthornavirae
- Phylum: Pisuviricota
- Class: Pisoniviricetes
- Order: Picornavirales
- Family: Secoviridae
- Genus: Nepovirus
- Virus: Lucerne Australian latent virus

Synonyms
- Lucerne latent virus

Species of virus

Lucerne Australian latent virus (LALV) is a plant pathogenic virus of the family Secoviridae.
