= Maize chlorotic dwarf virus =

Virus classification
- (unranked): Virus
- Realm: Riboviria
- Kingdom: Orthornavirae
- Phylum: Pisuviricota
- Class: Pisoniviricetes
- Order: Picornavirales
- Family: Secoviridae
- Genus: Waikavirus
- Species: Waikavirus zeae

Synonyms
- Ohio corn stunt agent

Species of virus

Maize chlorotic dwarf virus (MCDV) is a plant pathogenic virus of the family Secoviridae.
