= Cassava green mottle virus =

Virus classification
- (unranked): Virus
- Realm: Riboviria
- Kingdom: Orthornavirae
- Phylum: Pisuviricota
- Class: Pisoniviricetes
- Order: Picornavirales
- Family: Secoviridae
- Genus: Nepovirus
- Species: Nepovirus manihotis

Species of virus

Cassava green mottle virus (CGMV) is a plant pathogenic virus of the family Secoviridae. Pathogens:

CGMV is caused by a virus called Cassava Mosaic Virus (CMV) which is transmitted by the whitefly and affects the leaves of the cassava plant. The virus infects the plant and interferes with the plant's ability to develop and produce crops.

Symptoms:

- The symptoms of CGMV include:

- Green spots or yellow patches on the leaves of the cassava plant that look like they were painted on.

- Leaves become distorted and stunted in growth.

- The plant may die if the disease is severe.

Treatments:

- There are currently no pesticides or antibiotics that can be used to treat CGM. The most effective way to prevent the spread of the disease is to control the whiteflies that spread it. Here are some measures that can be taken to control it:

- Encourage natural predators of whiteflies like ladybugs and lacewings in the area around the cassava plants.

- Plant disease-resistant cassava varieties.

- Remove diseased cassava plants from the field immediately to prevent the spread of the disease.

- Practice crop rotation and avoid planting cassava in the same area over and over again.
