= Artichoke Italian latent virus =

Virus classification
- (unranked): Virus
- Realm: Riboviria
- Kingdom: Orthornavirae
- Phylum: Pisuviricota
- Class: Pisoniviricetes
- Order: Picornavirales
- Family: Secoviridae
- Genus: Nepovirus
- Species: Nepovirus italiaense

Species of virus

Artichoke Italian latent virus is a virus that infects plants. It consists of two segments of positive-sense, single-stranded RNA enclosed in an icosahedral capsid. Artichoke Italian latent virus can infect a variety of flowering plants, causing discoloration and growth stunting.

== See also ==
- List of grape diseases
