= Rice tungro spherical virus =

Virus classification
- (unranked): Virus
- Realm: Riboviria
- Kingdom: Orthornavirae
- Phylum: Pisuviricota
- Class: Pisoniviricetes
- Order: Picornavirales
- Family: Secoviridae
- Genus: Waikavirus
- Species: Waikavirus oryzae

Synonyms
- rice leaf yellowing virus rice penyakit habeng virus rice penyakit mentek virus rice waia virus rice yellow leaf virus

Species of virus

Rice tungro spherical virus (RTSV) is a plant pathogenic virus of the family Secoviridae. RTSV causes mild symptoms by itself, but in the presence of Rice tungro bacilliform virus, symptoms are intensified.
