= Tungrovirus =

Virus classification
- (unranked): Virus
- Realm: Riboviria
- Kingdom: Pararnavirae
- Phylum: Artverviricota
- Class: Revtraviricetes
- Order: Ortervirales
- Family: Caulimoviridae
- Genus: Tungrovirus

Genus of viruses

Tungrovirus is a genus of viruses, in the family Caulimoviridae, order Ortervirales. Monocots and family Poaceae serve as natural hosts. The genus contains two species. Diseases associated with this genus include: stunting, yellow to orange leaf discoloration with fewer tillers. Tungro means 'degenerated growth' in a Filipino dialect and the virus was first observed in the Philippines 1975.

== Taxonomy ==
The genus contains the following species, listed by scientific name and followed by the exemplar virus of the species:

- Tungrovirus agapanthi, Agapanthus tungro virus
- Tungrovirus oryzae, Rice tungro bacilliform virus

== Structure ==
Viruses in Tungrovirus are non-enveloped, with icosahedral and bacilliform geometries, and T=3 symmetry. Genomes are circular. The virus withstands temperatures below 63-degree Celsius for 10 minutes. The tungro virus is known to have at least two strains - S and M. The 'S' strain in these varieties produces conspicuous interveinal chlorosis, giving an appearance of yellow stripe and sometimes irregular chlorotic specks on younger leaves. On the other hand, the 'M' strain produces only mottling.

Genus	Structure	Symmetry	Capsid	Genomic arrangement	Genomic segmentation
Tungrovirus	Bacilliform	T=3	Non-enveloped	Circular	Monopartite

== Life cycle ==
Viral replication is nuclear/cytoplasmic. Replication follows the dsDNA(RT) replication model. The method of transcription is dsDNA(RT) transcription. Translation takes place by leaky scanning, and ribosomal shunting. The virus exits the host cell by nuclear pore export, and tubule-guided viral movement. Monocots and family poaceae serve as the natural host. The virus is transmitted via vectors such as aphids and leafhoppers (e.g. Nephotettix spp.).

Genus	Host details	Tissue tropism	Entry details	Release details	Replication site	Assembly site	Transmission
Tungrovirus	Plants	None	Viral movement; mechanical inoculation	Viral movement	Nucleus	Cytoplasm	Mechanical inoculation: aphids

== Clinical ==
Tungro affected rice plants are stunted and have reduced numbers of tillers. The young emerging leaves develop interveinal chlorosis leading to discoloration of the leaves, starting from the tips downwards. Often the whole leaf is discolored. Plants infected at an early stage generally die prematurely. Infected plants take more time to mature because of delayed flowering. The panicles are often poorly developed and the grains are also often covered with dark brown blotches and are lighter weight than those of healthy plants.

After twelve days Tungro infection causes little damage, however there is extensive damage after one month. The severe syndrome known as Tungro disease is not caused by Rice tungro bacilliform virus alone - this requires coinfection with Rice tungro spherical virus.

== Resistance ==
Oryza officinalis in Sukhothai Province, Thailand was reported in 1990 to be highly resistant to tungro and already in use in several cultivars. (Note: p. 53, "Oryza officinalis from Sukothai, Thailand, is a good source of resistance to several pests and diseases; it has been used in a number of crosses to derive high-yielding lines with multiple pest resistance.") (Note: p. 520, "An accession of O. officinalis from Thailand showed high resistance to RTD (62), although it is not yet known whether this resistance is due to resistance to the vector, to the viruses themselves, or to some combination of these resistances. Results from recent research indicate that resistance to RTD is present in many wild rice species (R. Ikeda, personal communication), and perhaps some will show resistance to RTBV.")
