= Longidorus sylphus =

Thorne's needle nematode

Scientific classification
- Domain: Eukaryota
- Kingdom: Animalia
- Phylum: Nematoda
- Class: Enoplea
- Order: Dorylaimida
- Family: Longidoridae
- Genus: Longidorus
- Species: L. sylphus

Binomial name
- Longidorus sylphus Thorne, 1939

Synonyms
- Longidorus elongatus (de Man, 1876) Thorne & Swanger, 1936; Longidorus menthosolanus

Species of roundworm

Longidorus sylphus (Thorne's needle nematode) is a plant pathogenic nematode, which attacks mint.
