= Cheravirus =

Virus classification
- (unranked): Virus
- Realm: Riboviria
- Kingdom: Orthornavirae
- Phylum: Pisuviricota
- Class: Pisoniviricetes
- Order: Picornavirales
- Family: Secoviridae
- Genus: Cheravirus

Genus of viruses

Cheravirus is a genus of viruses in the order Picornavirales, in the family Secoviridae. Plants serve as natural hosts. There are 11 species in this genus.

The name is derived from Cherry rasp leaf virus.

== Taxonomy ==
The genus contains the following species, listed by scientific name and followed by the exemplar virus of the species:

- Cheravirus alpinum, Alpine wild prunus virus
- Cheravirus, Arracacha virus B
- Cheravirus avii, Cherry rasp leaf virus
- Cheravirus corymbii, Corymbium villosum cheravirus
- Cheravirus lagerstroemiae, Lagerstroemia indica cheravirus
- Cheravirus mali, Apple latent spherical virus
- Cheravirus orobanchis, Orobanche cernua secovirus
- Cheravirus pruni, Stocky prune virus
- Cheravirus pternopetali, Pternopetalum trichomanifolium cheravirus
- Cheravirus ribis, Currant latent virus
- Cheravirus trillii, Trillium govanianum cheravirus

== Structure ==
Viruses in Cheravirus are non-enveloped, with icosahedral geometries, and T=pseudo3 symmetry. The diameter is around 25-30 nm. Genomes are linear and bipartite, around 13.3kb in length.

| Genus | Structure | Symmetry | Capsid | Genomic arrangement | Genomic segmentation |
|---|---|---|---|---|---|
| Cheravirus | Icosahedral | Pseudo T=3 | Non-enveloped | Linear | Segmented |

== Life cycle ==
Viral replication is cytoplasmic, and is lysogenic. Entry into the host cell is achieved by penetration into the host cell. Replication follows the positive stranded RNA virus replication model. Positive stranded RNA virus transcription is the method of transcription. The virus exits the host cell by tubule-guided viral movement. Plants serve as the natural host. The virus is transmitted via a vector (nematodes maybe seed-transmitted). Transmission routes are vector and seed borne.

| Genus | Host details | Tissue tropism | Entry details | Release details | Replication site | Assembly site | Transmission |
|---|---|---|---|---|---|---|---|
| Cheravirus | Plants | None | Viral movement; mechanical inoculation | Viral movement | Cytoplasm | Cytoplasm | Nematodes; mites; thrips |
