= Ampeloglypter =

Scientific classification
- Kingdom: Animalia
- Phylum: Arthropoda
- Class: Insecta
- Order: Coleoptera
- Suborder: Polyphaga
- Infraorder: Cucujiformia
- Family: Curculionidae
- Subfamily: Baridinae
- Tribe: Madarini
- Genus: Ampeloglypter; LeConte, 1876

Species
- See text

Genus of beetles

Ampeloglypter is a genus of true weevils in the tribe Madarini.

== Species ==
- Ampeloglypter ampelopsis Hustache, A., 1938
- Ampeloglypter ater LeConte, J.L., 1876
- Ampeloglypter binodosus Champion, G.C., 1908
- Ampeloglypter brunescens Hustache, 1951
- Ampeloglypter cayennensis Hustache, 1951
- Ampeloglypter cissi Marshall, G.A.K., 1922
- Ampeloglypter crenatus LeConte, J.L., 1876
- Ampeloglypter definitus Casey, 1922
- Ampeloglypter definitus Casey, T.L., 1922
- Ampeloglypter devinctus Casey, T.L., 1922
- Ampeloglypter elatus Casey, T.L., 1922
- Ampeloglypter fusiformis Casey, T.L., 1922
- Ampeloglypter heterosternoides Hustache, 1951
- Ampeloglypter inanis Hustache, A., 1938
- Ampeloglypter laevis Hustache, 1951
- Ampeloglypter longiclava Hustache, 1951
- Ampeloglypter longipennis Casey, T.L., 1892
- Ampeloglypter minutus Casey, T.L., 1922
- Ampeloglypter nicaraguensis Solari, F., 1906
- Ampeloglypter nigrinus Casey, T.L., 1922
- Ampeloglypter nugator Casey, T.L., 1922
- Ampeloglypter ovalis Champion, G.C., 1908
- Ampeloglypter pertinax Casey, T.L., 1922
- Ampeloglypter pilosellus Hustache, 1951
- Ampeloglypter plicatipennis Champion, G.C., 1908
- Ampeloglypter probatus Casey, T.L., 1922
- Ampeloglypter sesostris LeConte, J.L., 1876
- Ampeloglypter singularis Hustache, 1951
- Ampeloglypter speculifer Solari, F., 1906
- Ampeloglypter sulcifrons Champion, G.C., 1908
- Ampeloglypter tubulatus Casey, T.L., 1922
- Ampeloglypter vicinus Hustache, 1951
- Ampeloglypter vitis Hustache, A., 1938
