= Ampeloglypter ampelopsis =

Scientific classification
- Domain: Eukaryota
- Kingdom: Animalia
- Phylum: Arthropoda
- Class: Insecta
- Order: Coleoptera
- Suborder: Polyphaga
- Infraorder: Cucujiformia
- Family: Curculionidae
- Genus: Ampeloglypter
- Species: A. ampelopsis

Binomial name
- Ampeloglypter ampelopsis (Riley, 1869)

Synonyms
- Ampeloglypter ater LeConte, 1876

Species of weevil beetle

Ampeloglypter ampelopsis, the grape cane girdler, is a species of flower weevil in the beetle family Curculionidae.
