= Raspberry ringspot virus =

Virus classification
- (unranked): Virus
- Realm: Riboviria
- Kingdom: Orthornavirae
- Phylum: Pisuviricota
- Class: Pisoniviricetes
- Order: Picornavirales
- Family: Secoviridae
- Genus: Nepovirus
- Species: Nepovirus rubi

Synonyms
- raspberry Scottish leaf curl virus; red currant ringspot virus

Species of virus

Raspberry ringspot virus (RRSV) is a plant pathogenic virus of the family Secoviridae. It was first described by Cadman in 1958. It causes ringspots in raspberries and strawberries and can cause rasp-leaf symptoms in cherry. It also has been found in many other plants including those in the Vitis and Narcissus genera. There are many strains of the virus, the most important including the Scottish strain, the English strain, and the Lloyd George yellow blotch strain. The Scottish strain is the type virus.

This virus can be transmitted by nematode vectors. The Scottish strain is mostly spread by Longidorus elongatus, and the English strain by Longidorus macrosoma.
