= Waikavirus =

Virus classification
- (unranked): Virus
- Realm: Riboviria
- Kingdom: Orthornavirae
- Phylum: Pisuviricota
- Class: Pisoniviricetes
- Order: Picornavirales
- Family: Secoviridae
- Genus: Waikavirus

Genus of viruses

Waikavirus is a genus of viruses in the order Picornavirales, in the family Secoviridae. Plants, poaceae, cyperaceae, and gramineae serve as natural hosts. The genus contains 42 species assigned to two subgenera. Diseases associated with this genus include: MCDV: plant stunting and chlorotic striping of tertiary leaf veins in maize.

== Taxonomy ==
The genus contains the following species in the subgenus Actinidivirus:

- Waikavirus actinidiae, Actinidia yellowing virus 1
- Waikavirus betacamelliae, Camellia virus B
- Waikavirus camelliae, Camellia virus A
- Waikavirus carotae, Carrot psyllid-borne associated virus
- Waikavirus celtis, Hackberry virus A
- Waikavirus diospyri, Persimmon waikavirus
- Waikavirus heveae, Rubber waikavirus
- Waikavirus hirtae, Ficus hirta waikavirus
- Waikavirus juglandis, Juglans nigra waikavirus
- Waikavirus liegense, Poaceae Liege virus 1
- Waikavirus pittospori, Pittosporum tobira virus
- Waikavirus populi, Populus alba waikavirus
- Waikavirus querci, Quercus robur waikavirus
- Waikavirus rhododendri, Rhododendron delavayi secovirus
- Waikavirus trifoccidentale, Trifolium occidentale waikavirus

The genus contains the following species in the subgenus Ritunrivirus:

- Waikavirus ajugae, Ajuga Reptans waikavirus
- Waikavirus anacycli, Anacyclus depressus waikavirus
- Waikavirus artemisiae, Sweet wormwood waikavirus
- Waikavirus brassicae, Brassica napus RNA virus 1
- Waikavirus campanulae, Bellflower vein chlorosis virus
- Waikavirus convallariae, Asian lily-of-the-valley waikavirus
- Waikavirus duoplantae, Plant associated waikavirus 2
- Waikavirus eleocharis, Eleocharis dulcis waikavirus
- Waikavirus euphorbiae, Euphorbia ebracteolata waikavirus
- Waikavirus gentianae, Gentiana straminea waikavirus
- Waikavirus lactucae, Lettuce waikavirus 1
- Waikavirus ligustici, Ligusticum chuanxiong waikavirus
- Waikavirus lycopi, Gypsywort waikavirus
- Waikavirus mertensiae, Mertensia paniculata waikavirus
- Waikavirus oryzae, Rice tungro spherical virus
- Waikavirus pagodae, Pagoda dogwood waikavirus
- Waikavirus pedicularis, Pedicularis rex waikavirus
- Waikavirus primulae, Primula vulgaris waikavirus
- Waikavirus ranunculi, Ranunculus cantoniensis waikavirus
- Waikavirus ribesnigri, Blackcurrant waikavirus A
- Waikavirus rosae, Sweetbriar rose curly top-associated virus
- Waikavirus swalleniae, Eureka dunegrass waikavirus
- Waikavirus thapsiae, Thapsia villosa waikavirus
- Waikavirus thymi, Thymus vulgaris waikavirus
- Waikavirus trifolii, Red clover-associated virus 1
- Waikavirus violae, Viola inconspicua waikavirus
- Waikavirus zeae, Maize chlorotic dwarf virus

== Structure ==
Viruses in Waikavirus are non-enveloped, with icosahedral geometries, and T=pseudo3 symmetry. The diameter is around 30 nm. Genomes are linear, around 12kb in length.

Genus	Structure	Symmetry	Capsid	Genomic arrangement	Genomic segmentation
Waikavirus	Icosahedral	Pseudo T=3	Non-enveloped	Linear	Monopartite

== Life cycle ==
Viral replication is cytoplasmic. Entry into the host cell is achieved by penetration into the host cell. Replication follows the positive stranded RNA virus replication model. Positive stranded RNA virus transcription is the method of transcription. The virus exits the host cell by tubule-guided viral movement. Plants, poaceae, cyperaceae, and gramineae serve as the natural host. The virus is transmitted via a vector (insects). Transmission routes are vector and mechanical.

Genus	Host details	Tissue tropism	Entry details	Release details	Replication site	Assembly site	Transmission
Waikavirus	Gramineae	Phloem; phloem parenchyma; bundle sheath	Viral movement	Viral movement	Cytoplasm	Cytoplasm	Mechanical innocuation: aphids; mechanical innocuation: leafhoppers
