= Grapevine Bulgarian latent virus =

Virus classification
- (unranked): Virus
- Realm: Riboviria
- Kingdom: Orthornavirae
- Phylum: Pisuviricota
- Class: Pisoniviricetes
- Order: Picornavirales
- Family: Secoviridae
- Genus: Nepovirus
- Species: Nepovirus bulgariense

Species of virus

Grapevine Bulgarian latent virus (GBLV) is a plant pathogenic virus of the family Secoviridae.
