= Ampeloglypter longipennis =

Scientific classification
- Kingdom: Animalia
- Phylum: Arthropoda
- Class: Insecta
- Order: Coleoptera
- Suborder: Polyphaga
- Infraorder: Cucujiformia
- Family: Curculionidae
- Genus: Ampeloglypter
- Species: A. longipennis

Binomial name
- Ampeloglypter longipennis Casey, 1892

Species of weevil beetle

Ampeloglypter longipennis is a species of flower weevil in the beetle family Curculionidae. It is found in North America.
