= Sequivirus =

Virus classification
- (unranked): Virus
- Realm: Riboviria
- Kingdom: Orthornavirae
- Phylum: Pisuviricota
- Class: Pisoniviricetes
- Order: Picornavirales
- Family: Secoviridae
- Genus: Sequivirus

Genus of viruses

Sequivirus is a genus of viruses in the order Picornavirales, in the family Secoviridae. Plants serve as natural hosts. There are five species in this genus. Diseases associated with this genus include: PYFV: vein-yellowing, yellow flecks and yellow/green mosaic symptoms in parsnip, and ‘yellow net', followed by yellow spots and leaf distortion in celery.

== Taxonomy ==
The genus contains the following species, listed by scientific name and followed by the exemplar virus of the species:

- Sequivirus carotae, Carrot necrotic dieback virus
- Sequivirus pastinacae, Parsnip yellow fleck virus
- Sequivirus primulae, Cowslip sequivirus
- Sequivirus stellatum, Lettuce star mosaic virus
- Sequivirus taraxaci, Dandelion yellow mosaic virus

== Structure ==
Viruses in Sequivirus are non-enveloped, with icosahedral geometries, and T=pseudo3 symmetry. The diameter is around 25-30 nm. Genomes are linear and non-segmented, around 9kb in length.

Genus	Structure	Symmetry	Capsid	Genomic arrangement	Genomic segmentation
Sequivirus	Icosahedral	Pseudo T=3	Non-enveloped	Linear	Monopartite

== Life cycle ==
Viral replication is cytoplasmic. Entry into the host cell is achieved by penetration into the host cell. Replication follows the positive stranded RNA virus replication model. Positive stranded RNA virus transcription is the method of transcription. The virus exits the host cell by tubule-guided viral movement. Plants serve as the natural host. The virus is transmitted via a vector (insects (aphids). Transmission routes are vector and mechanical.

Genus	Host details	Tissue tropism	Entry details	Release details	Replication site	Assembly site	Transmission
Sequivirus	Plants	None	Viral movement; mechanical inoculation	Viral movement	Cytoplasm	Cytoplasm	Mechanical inoculation: aphids; Mechanical inoculation: Cavariella aegopodii; Mechanical inoculation: Cavariella pastinacae
