= Xiphinema index =

Scientific classification
- Kingdom: Animalia
- Phylum: Nematoda
- Class: Enoplea
- Order: Dorylaimida
- Family: Longidoridae
- Genus: Xiphinema
- Species: X. index

Binomial name
- Xiphinema index Thorne & Allen, 1950

Species of roundworm

Xiphinema index, the California dagger nematode, is a species of plant-parasitic nematodes.

== History ==
A major pest of grapes, the California dagger nematode provided the first example of a nematode acting as a vector for a viral plant disease. It has spread to multiple continents where there is viticulture production.

== Description ==
Xiphinema index is a migratory ectoparasite that primarily feeds on the root tips of grapes (Vitis vinifera). The body of a female is around 3 mm long, and the odontostyle is approximately 126 um long. There is a thick cuticle with thin striations across the body. The female has one or two ovaries that are typically paired. Males and females both have dorsally rounded tails that are short. Feeding on a susceptible host causes the root stunting and tip galling. Furthermore, it is a vector of the grapevine fanleaf virus. Other hosts of this parasite include fig, apple, rose, pistachio, as well as several others.

== Life cycle and reproduction ==
The females of this species lay their eggs in the soil near potential hosts. The first molt does not occur until 24–48 hours after hatching. The following molts occur in six-day intervals after, and complete a life-cycle within 22–27 days. However, a life cycle of several months has also been reported. The nematode can reproduce by parthenogenesis, and thus one female can reproduce an entire population. The nematode survives primarily in the egg stage, although other stages can survive in the soil for up to three years. Xiphinema index causes both mechanical and physiological damage, and may cause terminal swelling and necrosis on the roots of its susceptible hosts.

== Distribution ==
Xiphinema index has been found to in the following regions: Argentina, Australia, Chile, France, Germany, Greece, Hungary, Iran, Iraq, Italy, North Africa, Portugal, South Africa, Spain, Turkey and USA. In California, it is typically found in the north but can sometimes reach as far south as Kern County. Dagger nematodes can be found in most soil types, and their numbers typically decrease with soil depth. This nematode can be found as deep as 360 cm in the soil. Favorable soil conditions for this nematode are light to medium soil, a pH between 6.5 and 7.5, and relatively warm soil temperatures. California dagger nematode can survive soil temperatures of -11 °C to 35 °C but long term exposure to cold kills the nematode.

== Vector of Grapevine Fanleaf Virus ==
Grapevine fanleaf virus (GFLV), the cause of fanleaf degradation, is the most destructive viral disease of grapes worldwide. Xiphinema index was discovered to be a vector of this disease in the 1950s. It causes yellow mosaic and bands on the leaves, and may result in an 80% reduction in fruit set, causing huge economic losses. It is spread by contaminated seed and the grafting of infected rootstocks. In an early experiment, it was shown that California dagger nematodes inoculated with GFLV were still infective after eight months. It is speculated that the two pathogens evolved together, since there is evidence that the presence of GFLV gives a survival advantage to X. index and not other species of nematodes. In a more recent study, it was shown that GFLV persists in juveniles of X. index for over four years, as determined by RT-PCR.

== Management ==
Infected roots should be removed from the vineyard, and a non-host should be grown for several years, if possible. Historically, this pest has been managed by the use of chemical fumigants, such as 1,3-Dichloropropene and Methyl Bromide. There are few post-plant chemical options to manage this pest. These fumigants must be applied deeply in the soil to be effective, as the nematode can reside deeply in the soil and thus resist attempts to eradicate it completely. Rootstocks that are bred for resistance to both GFLV and X. index have proven to be effective at managing the disease. An effective rootstock must be resistant to both the virus and the nematode. Hot water treatments of rootstocks to be planted ensures there will be little chance of the introducing the disease into the field. Preventing the introduction of infected plant or soil material is essential to manage both X. index and GFLV.
