= Torradovirus =

Virus classification
- (unranked): Virus
- Realm: Riboviria
- Kingdom: Orthornavirae
- Phylum: Pisuviricota
- Class: Pisoniviricetes
- Order: Picornavirales
- Family: Secoviridae
- Genus: Torradovirus

Genus of viruses

Torradovirus is a genus of viruses in the order Picornavirales, in the family Secoviridae. Plants serve as natural hosts. There are 16 species in this genus. Diseases associated with this genus include: torrado disease: severe necrosis of leaves and fruits.

== Taxonomy ==
The genus contains the following species, listed by scientific name and followed by the exemplar virus of the species:

- Torradovirus arctii, Burdock mosaic virus
- Torradovirus cardiacae, Motherwort yellow mottle virus
- Torradovirus carotae, Carrot torradovirus 1
- Torradovirus codonopsis, Codonopsis torradovirus A
- Torradovirus cucurbitae, Squash chlorotic leaf spot virus
- Torradovirus erigeronis, Fleabane yellow mosaic torradovirus
- Torradovirus lactucae, Lettuce necrotic leaf curl virus
- Torradovirus lophophyti, Lophophytum mirabile torradovirus
- Torradovirus lycopersici, Tomato torrado virus
- Torradovirus manihotis, Cassava torrado-like virus
- Torradovirus marchitezum, Tomato marchitez virus
- Torradovirus nanorugosum, Potato rugose stunting virus
- Torradovirus ophistopappi, Opisthopappus taihangensis torradovirus
- Torradovirus physalis, Physalis torrado virus
- Torradovirus rorippae, Lake cress torradovirus
- Torradovirus sesami, Sesamum torradovirus

== Structure ==
Viruses in Torradovirus are non-enveloped, with icosahedral geometries, and T=pseudo3 symmetry. The diameter is around 30 nm. Genomes are linear and segmented, bipartite, around 25.4kb in length.

Genus	Structure	Symmetry	Capsid	Genomic arrangement	Genomic segmentation
Torradovirus	Icosahedral	Pseudo T=3	Non-enveloped	Linear	Monopartite

== Life cycle ==
Viral replication is cytoplasmic. Entry into the host cell is achieved by penetration into the host cell. Replication follows the positive stranded RNA virus replication model. Positive stranded RNA virus transcription is the method of transcription. The virus exits the host cell by tubule-guided viral movement. Plants serve as the natural host. The virus is transmitted via a vector (whitefly). Transmission routes are vector and mechanical.

Genus	Host details	Tissue tropism	Entry details	Release details	Replication site	Assembly site	Transmission
Torradovirus	Plants	None	Viral movement; mechanical inoculation	Viral movement	Cytoplasm	Cytoplasm	Vector; mechanical
