= Paralongidorus =

Scientific classification
- Kingdom: Animalia
- Phylum: Nematoda
- Class: Enoplea
- Order: Dorylaimida
- Family: Longidoridae
- Genus: Paralongidorus

Genus of roundworms

Paralongidorus is a genus of the family Longidoridae which is in the phylum Nematodes.

== Species of this genus ==
According to Catalogue of Life:

- Paralongidorus agni Sharma & Edward, 1985
- Paralongidorus australis Stirling & McCulloch, 1985
- Paralongidorus bikanerensis (Lal & Mathur, 1987) Siddiqi, Baujard & Mounport, 1993
- Paralongidorus buckeri Sharma & Edward, 1985
- Paralongidorus cebensis Heyns & Coomans, 1989
- Paralongidorus ciaressi Dhanam & Jairajpuri, 1997
- Paralongidorus dakarensis Faye & Mounport, 2007
- Paralongidorus distinctus Baqri & Jairajpuri, 1981
- Paralongidorus duncani Siddiqi, Baujard & Mounport, 1993
- Paralongidorus esci Khan, Chawla & Saha, 1978
- Paralongidorus fici Edward, Misra & Singh, 1964
- Paralongidorus flexus Khan, Seshadri, Weischer & Mathen, 1971
- Paralongidorus francolambertii Barsi & De Luca, 2017
- Paralongidorus halepensis Lamberti, Molinari, De Luca, Agostinelli & Di Vito, 1999
- Paralongidorus iberis Escuer & Arias, 1997
- Paralongidorus iranicus Pedram, Pourjam, Namjou, Atighi, Cantalapiedra-Navarrete, Liébanas, Palomares-Rius & Castillo, 2012
- Paralongidorus koreanensis Mwamula, Decraemer, Kim, Ko, Na, Kim & Lee, 2020
- Paralongidorus koreanus Mwamula, Decraemer, Kim, Ko, Na, Kim & Lee, 2020
- Paralongidorus lusitanicus Gutiérrez-Gutiérrez, Mota, Castillo, Santos & Palomares-Rius, 2018
- Paralongidorus lutensis Hunt & Rahman, 1991
- Paralongidorus microlaimus Siddiqi, 1964
- Paralongidorus nudus (Kirjanova, 1951) Lamberti, 1975
- Paralongidorus oryzae Verma, 1973
- Paralongidorus pini (Jacobs & Heyns, 1987) Siddiqi, Baujard & Mounport, 1993
- Paralongidorus plesioepimikis Palomares-Rius, Cantalapiedra-Navarrete, Gutiérrez-Gutiérrez, Liébanas & Castillo, 2013
- Paralongidorus pulcher (Jacobs & Heyns, 1982) Siddiqi, Baujard & Mounport, 1993
- Paralongidorus pulcheroides (Jacobs & Heyns, 1987) Siddiqi, Baujard & Mounport, 1993
- Paralongidorus rotundatus Khan, 1987
- Paralongidorus sacchari Siddiqi, Khan & Hooper, 1963
- Paralongidorus sali Siddiqi, Khan & Hooper, 1963
- Paralongidorus sandellus (Heyns, 1966) Hunt, 1993
- Paralongidorus sativus (Soni & Nama, 1983) Escuer & Arias, 1997
- Paralongidorus silvestris Faye & Mounport, 2010
- Paralongidorus similis Khan, Chawla & Prasad, 1972
- Paralongidorus wiesae (Heyns, 1994) Escuer & Arias, 1997
- Paralongidorus zenobiae Hunt & Rahman, 1991
