= Tomato ringspot virus =

Virus classification
- (unranked): Virus
- Realm: Riboviria
- Kingdom: Orthornavirae
- Phylum: Pisuviricota
- Class: Pisoniviricetes
- Order: Picornavirales
- Family: Secoviridae
- Genus: Nepovirus
- Species: Nepovirus lycopersici

Synonyms
- blackberry Himalaya mosaic virus; euonymus ringspot virus; grape yellow vein virus; grapevine yellow vein virus; peach yellow bud mosaic virus; prune brown line virus; prunus stem-pitting virus; red currant mosaic virus; tobacco ringspot virus 2; winter peach mosaic virus

Species of virus

Tomato ringspot virus (ToRSV) is a plant pathogenic virus of the family Secoviridae. It affects species of cucumber, tobacco, tomato, cowpea, among others. It causes ringspots in tobacco plants and raspberries, yellow bud mosaic in peaches, yellow vein in grapes, and stunted growth in gladiolus and Narcissus. Its range is in the temperate regions of North America, especially where its vector, Xiphinema americanum is present. Along with the adult and larval stages of this nematode, the virus is also spread by seed. This type of infection is more common in strawberries and soybeans than any other susceptible plant.

== See also ==
- Viral diseases of potato
