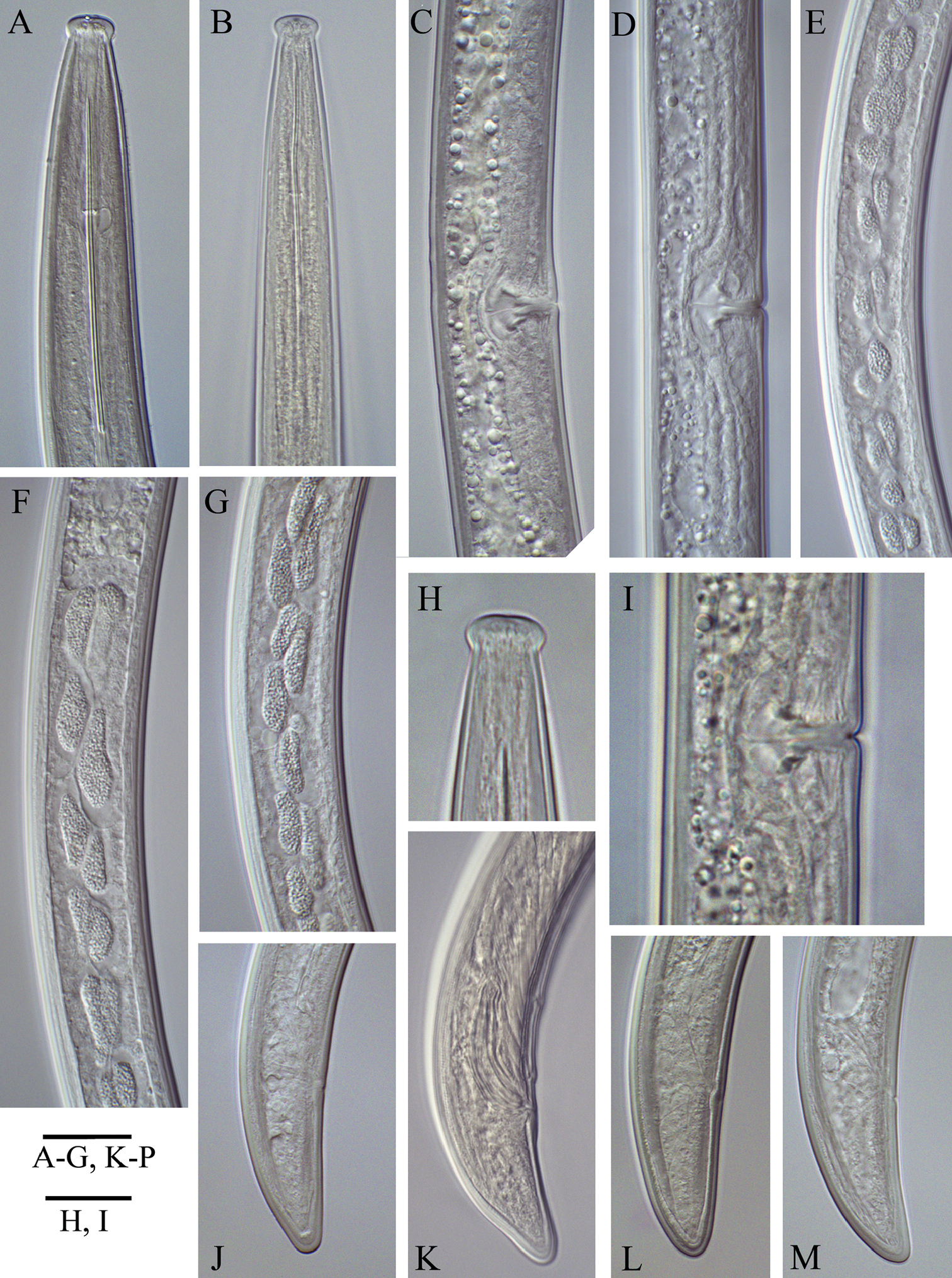
- Longidurus pisi - A is a female and B is a male. The image also shows reproductive parts etc.

Scientific classification
- Kingdom: Animalia
- Phylum: Nematoda
- Class: Enoplea
- Order: Dorylaimida
- Family: Longidoridae
- Genus: Longidorus; Micoletzky, 1922

Species
- Longidorus africanus; Longidorus sylphus; Longidorus americanum; Longidorus elongatus

= Longidorus =

Genus of roundworms

Longidorus is a genus of needle nematodes. Some of its species are plant pests.

They may also transmit important plant viruses such as the potato virus U or the cacao necrosis virus.

Species are known to infest pines, narcissus, mint, alfalfa, beet, caneberries, lettuce, grape and citrus.

== Bibliography ==
- Zuckerman, Bert M.; Rohde, Richard A., eds. (1981). Plant Parasitic Nematodes vol. 3. Oxford: Elsevier Science. ISBN 978-0323147033.
- Singh, S. K.; Hodda, M.; Ash, G. J. (August 2013). "Plant-parasitic nematodes of potential phytosanitary importance, their main hosts and reported yield losses". EPPO Bulletin. 43 (2): 334–374. doi:10.1111/epp.12050.
- Gutiérrez-Gutiérrez, Carlos; Cantalapiedra-Navarrete, Carolina; Montes-Borrego, Miguel; Palomares-Rius, Juan E.; Castillo, Pablo (2013). "Molecular phylogeny of the nematode genus Longidorus (Nematoda: Longidoridae) with description of three new species" (PDF). Zoological Journal of the Linnean Society. 167 (4): 473–500. doi:10.1111/zoj.12019. hdl:10261/84055.
