= Tomato black ring virus =

Virus classification
- (unranked): Virus
- Realm: Riboviria
- Kingdom: Orthornavirae
- Phylum: Pisuviricota
- Class: Pisoniviricetes
- Order: Picornavirales
- Family: Secoviridae
- Genus: Nepovirus
- Species: Nepovirus nigranuli

Synonyms
- Bean ringspot virus; Celery yellow vein virus; Lettuce ringspot virus; Potato bouquet virus; Potato pseudo-aucuba virus

Species of virus

Tomato black ring virus (TBRV) is a plant pathogenic virus of the family Secoviridae, that was first discovered in 1946.

== Hosts ==
TBRV infects several hosts including:

- Allium cepa
- Allium porrum
- Apium graveolens
- Beta vulgaris var. saccharifera
- Brassica napus var. napobrassica
- Brassica rapa subsp. rapa
- Capsicum
- Cucumis sativus
- Cynara cardunculus var. scolymus
- Fragaria including Fragaria ananassa
- Gladiolus hybrids
- Lactuca sativa
- Narcissus
- Phaseolus vulgaris
- Prunus persica
- Ribes
- Rubus including Rubus idaeus
- Solanum lycopersicum
- Solanum melongena
- Solanum tuberosum
- Vitis vinifera
