= Ampeloglypter sesostris =

Scientific classification
- Kingdom: Animalia
- Phylum: Arthropoda
- Class: Insecta
- Order: Coleoptera
- Suborder: Polyphaga
- Infraorder: Cucujiformia
- Family: Curculionidae
- Genus: Ampeloglypter
- Species: A. sesostris

Binomial name
- Ampeloglypter sesostris (LeConte, J.L., 1876)

Synonyms
- Madarus vitis Riley, 1869

Species of weevil beetle

Ampeloglypter sesostris, the grape cane gallmaker, is a true weevil species in the genus Ampeloglypter. Research in Pennsylvania has shown no effect on berry quality or vine vigor.
