= Sadwavirus =

Virus classification
- (unranked): Virus
- Realm: Riboviria
- Kingdom: Orthornavirae
- Phylum: Pisuviricota
- Class: Pisoniviricetes
- Order: Picornavirales
- Family: Secoviridae
- Genus: Sadwavirus

Genus of viruses

Sadwavirus is a genus of viruses in the order Picornavirales, in the family Secoviridae. Plants (specifically Satsuma mandarin trees) serve as natural hosts. There are three subgenera and 15 species in this genus. Diseases associated with this genus include: satsuma dwarf virus disease which causes spoon-shaped leaves on citrus tree. Symptoms are enations, multiple flushing, stunting or dwarfing, reduction in number and size of leaves and fruits. The name of this genus comes from one of its species: Satsuma dwarf virus.

== Taxonomy ==
The following subgenera and species are recognized. Species in each subgenus are listed by scientific name and followed by the exemplar virus of the species.

- Cholivirus
  - Sadwavirus alphananas, Pineapple secovirus A
  - Sadwavirus betananas, Pineapple secovirus B
  - Sadwavirus cattleyae, Cattleya purple ringspot virus
  - Sadwavirus dioscoreae, Dioscorea mosaic associated virus
  - Sadwavirus fritillariae, Chocolate lily virus A
  - Sadwavirus gammananas, Ananas comosus secovirus
  - Sadwavirus gymnemae, Gymnema sylvestre virus 1
  - Sadwavirus kappananas, Pineapple secovirus C
- Satsumavirus
  - Sadwavirus citri, Satsuma dwarf virus
- Stramovirus
  - Sadwavirus aciphyllae, Surrounding non-legume associated virus
  - Sadwavirus chysanthemi, Chrysanthemum sadwavirus
  - Sadwavirus fragariae, Strawberry mottle virus
  - Sadwavirus lactucae, Lettuce secovirus 1
  - Sadwavirus morifolii, Chrysanthemum stramovirus
  - Sadwavirus rubi, Black raspberry necrosis virus

== Structure ==
Viruses in Sadwavirus are non-enveloped, with icosahedral geometries, and T=pseudo3 symmetry. The diameter is around 25-30 nm. The genome is segmented into two parts of linear, positive-sense, single-stranded RNA, 11000-12000 nucleotides in length, where one segment is about 7kb and the second segment is 4.6 to 5.4kb.

Genus	Structure	Symmetry	Capsid	Genomic arrangement	Genomic segmentation
Sadwavirus	Icosahedral	Pseudo T=3	Non-enveloped	Linear	Segmented

== Life cycle ==
Viral replication is cytoplasmic, and is lysogenic. Entry into the host cell is achieved by penetration into the host cell. Replication follows the positive stranded RNA virus replication model. Positive stranded RNA virus transcription is the method of transcription. The virus exits the host cell by tubule-guided viral movement. Plants serve as the natural host. The virus is transmitted via a vector (but not SMOV). Transmission routes are vector, seed borne, and grafting.

Genus	Host details	Tissue tropism	Entry details	Release details	Replication site	Assembly site	Transmission
Sadwavirus	Plants	None	Viral movement; mechanical inoculation	Viral movement	Cytoplasm	Cytoplasm	Nematodes; mites; thrips
