= Grapevine chrome mosaic virus =

Virus classification
- (unranked): Virus
- Realm: Riboviria
- Kingdom: Orthornavirae
- Phylum: Pisuviricota
- Class: Pisoniviricetes
- Order: Picornavirales
- Family: Secoviridae
- Genus: Nepovirus
- Species: Nepovirus chromusivum

Synonyms
- Hungarian chrome mosaic virus

Species of virus

Grapevine chrome mosaic virus (GCMV) is a plant pathogenic virus of the family Secoviridae.
