= Ampeloglypter ater =

Scientific classification
- Kingdom: Animalia
- Phylum: Arthropoda
- Class: Insecta
- Order: Coleoptera
- Suborder: Polyphaga
- Infraorder: Cucujiformia
- Family: Curculionidae
- Genus: Ampeloglypter
- Species: A. ater

Binomial name
- Ampeloglypter ater LeConte, J.L., 1876

Species of weevil beetle

Ampeloglypter ater, the grape cane girdler, is a true weevil species in the genus Ampeloglypter. It is a pest infecting grapevine.
