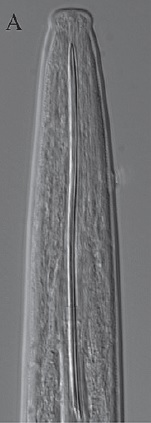
- Xiphinema parasimile female anterior

Scientific classification
- Kingdom: Animalia
- Phylum: Nematoda
- Class: Enoplea
- Order: Dorylaimida
- Family: Longidoridae
- Genus: Xiphinema; Cobb, 1913

Species
- See text

= Xiphinema =

Genus of roundworms

Xiphinema is a genus of ectoparasitic root nematodes commonly known as dagger nematodes. The genus is of economic importance on grape, strawberry, hops and a few other crops. Major species include X.americanum, X.diversicaudatum, X.index, X.italiae and X.pachtaicum. They can be easily recognized by their long bodies and stylets which are long enough to reach the vascular tissue of plants. Different members of the genus have been shown to induce moderate to large amounts of root damage through root penetration, which in some species results in the formation of galls. They are of agricultural concern because they are vectors of nepoviruses, transferring them during feeding. Efforts to study these nematodes in more detail have proved problematic in some species due to difficulties in maintaining populations in a greenhouse environment.

== Morphology ==
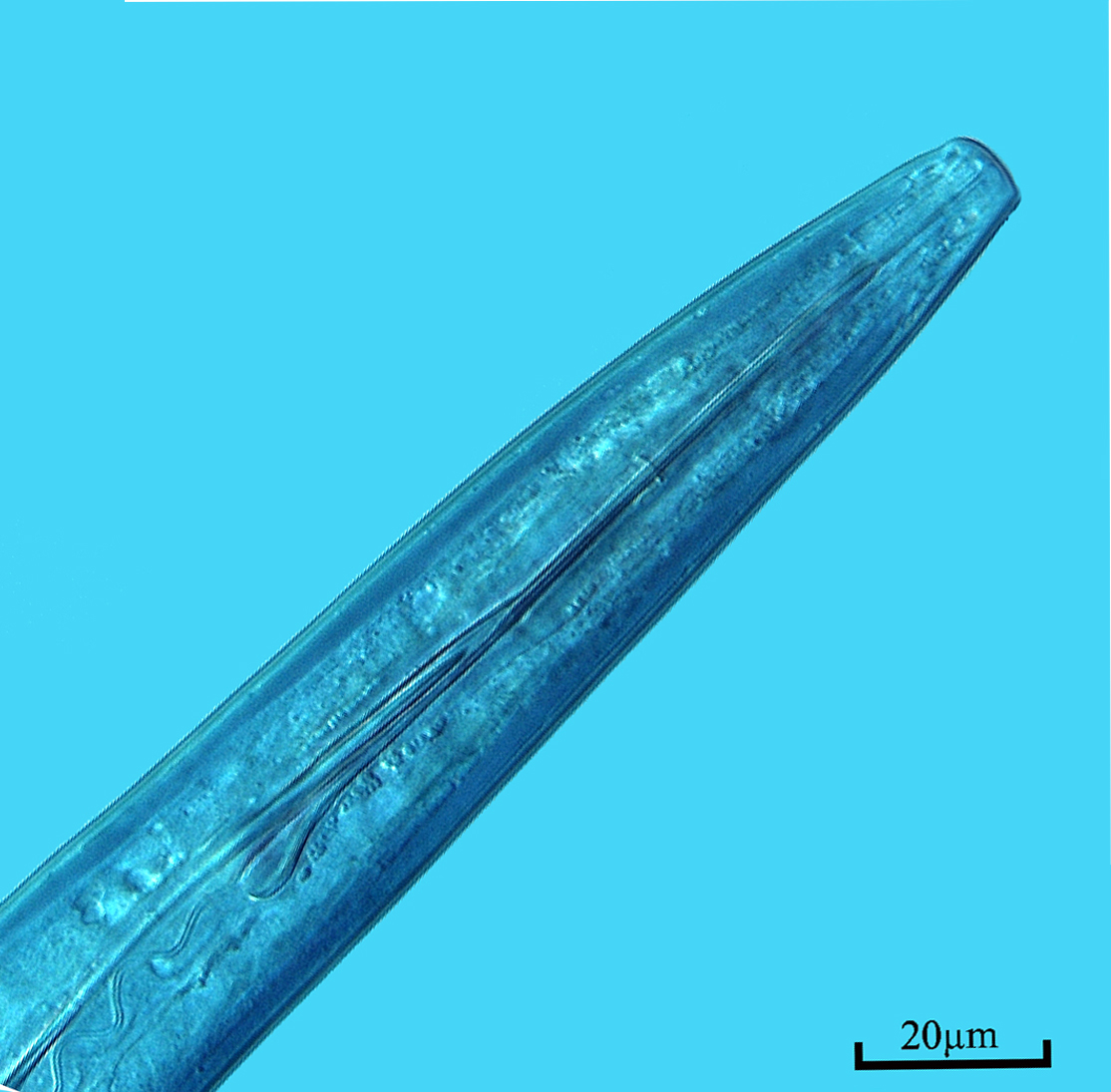
Mouth section of a Xiphinema sp. juvenile

Xiphinema are large nematodes, with an adult length between 1.5mm – 5.0mm. They have a long protrusible odontostyle, with 3 basal flanges at the posterior end of the stylet and a relatively posterior guiding ring when compared to the genus Longidorus. The odontostyle is lined with cuticle and alongside the esophagus serves as a good surface for viruses such as arabis mosaic virus to form a monolayer, which can be vectored to healthy plants. Xiphinema have a two-part esophagus, which does not contain a metacorpus. A modification in the posterior end of the esophagus forms a muscular posterior bulb, which can generate a pumping action similar to that of a metacorpus in other plant parasitic nematodes. The number of males varies from abundant to sparse depending on the species. Males have paired spicules but the gubernaculum and bursa are absent. Males of different species can be characterized using the varying number and arrangement of papillae. Females have 1 or 2 ovaries.

== Taxonomy ==
There are 296 nominal taxa, including 234 accepted species, 49 synonyms and 13 species inquirendae.(He 2003)

=== History ===
Xiphinema americanum was the first species to be described by Nathan Cobb in 1913, who speculated that it was likely a plant pathogen. This speculation was experimentally confirmed in 1949 and 1952.

=== List of species ===
N.B. This list is probably incomplete.

- Xiphinema abrantinum Roca & Pereira, 1991.
- Xiphinema aceri Chizhov & al., 1986.
- Xiphinema aequum Roca & Lamberti, 1988.
- Xiphinema americanum Cobb, 1913.
- Xiphinema artemisiae Chizhov & al., 1986.
- Xiphinema bakeri
- Xiphinema barense Lamberti & al., 1986.
- Xiphinema basilgoodeyi Coomans, 1965.
- Xiphinema belmontense Roca & Pereira, 1992.
- Xiphinema brevicolle Lordello & Da Costa, 1961.
- Xiphinema brevisicum Lamberti & al., 1994.
- Xiphinema cadavalense Bravo & Roca, 1995.
- Xiphinema coronatum Roca, 1991.
- Xiphinema coxi Tarjan, 1964.
  - Xiphinema coxi coxi Tarjan, 1964.
  - Xiphinema coxi europaeum Sturhan, 1985.
- Xiphinema dentatum Sturhan, 1978.
- Xiphinema diffusum Lamberti & Bleve-Zacheo, 1979.
- Xiphinema dissimile Roca & al., 1988.
- Xiphinema diversicaudatum (Micoletzky, 1927) — nématode migrant des racines.
- Xiphinema diversum Roca & al., 1989.
- Xiphinema duriense Lamberti & al., 1993.
- Xiphinema elongatum Schuurmans Stekhoven & Teunissen, 1938.
- Xiphinema exile Roca & al., 1989.
- Xiphinema fortuitum Roca & al., 1988.
- Xiphinema gersoni Roca & Bravo, 1993.
- Xiphinema globosum Sturhan, 1978.
- Xiphinema hispidum Roca & Bravo, 1994.
- Xiphinema histriae Lamberti & al., 1993.
- Xiphinema horvatovicae Barsi & Lamberti, 1999.
- Xiphinema illyricum Barsi & Lamberti, 1999.
- Xiphinema incertum Lamberti & al., 1983.
- Xiphinema incognitum Lamberti & Bleve-Zacheo, 1979.
- Xiphinema index Thorne & Allen, 1950.
- Xiphinema ingens Luc & Dalmasso, 1964.
- Xiphinema insigne
- Xiphinema intermedium Lamberti & Bleve-Zacheo, 1979.
- Xiphinema italiae Meyl, 1953.
- Xiphinema lafoense Roca & al., 1988.
- Xiphinema lanceolatum Roca & Bravo, 1993.
- Xiphinema lapidosum Roca & Bravo, 1993.
- Xiphinema longistilum Lamberti & al., 1994.
- Xiphinema lupini Roca & Pereira, 1993.
- Xiphinema lusitanicum Sturhan, 1983.
- Xiphinema macedonicum Barsi & Lamberti, 1999.
- Xiphinema macroacanthum Lamberti & al., 1989.
- Xiphinema madeirense Brown & al., 1992.
- Xiphinema melitense Lamberti & al., 1982.
- Xiphinema mesostilum Lamberti & al., 1994.
- Xiphinema microstilum Lamberti & al., 1994.
- Xiphinema neovuittenezi Dalmasso, 1969.
- Xiphinema opisthohysterum Siddiqi, 1961.
- Xiphinema pachtaicum (Tulaganov, 1938).
- Xiphinema pachydermum Sturhan, 1983.
- Xiphinema pombalense Bravo & Lamberti, 1996.
- Xiphinema porosum Roca & Agostinelli, 1986.
- Xiphinema pseudocoxi Sturhan, 1985.
- Xiphinema pyrenaicum Dalmasso, 1969.
- Xiphinema radicicola Goodey, 1936.
- Xiphinema riparium Chizhov & al., 1991.
- Xiphinema rivesi Dalmasso, 1969.
- Xiphinema rotundatum Schuurmans Stekhoven & Teunissen, 1938.
- Xiphinema sahelense Dalmasso, 1969.
- Xiphinema santos Lamberti & al., 1993.
- Xiphinema silvesi Roca & Bravo, 1998.
- Xiphinema simile Lamberti & al., 1983.
- Xiphinema taylori Lamberti & al., 1992.
- Xiphinema turcicum Luc & Dalmasso, 1964.
- Xiphinema variurum Barsi & Lamberti, 1998.
- Xiphinema vuittenezi Luc & al., 1964.

== Distribution ==
The genus Xiphinema is distributed worldwide. Two economically important Xiphinema species, X.index and X.americanum, are both commonly found in California and tend to be problematic in vineyards. X. diversicaudatum is also found in parts of the U.S., as well as Europe and Australia.

== Life cycle and reproduction ==
Eggs are laid singly in thin water layers in the soil and are not part of an egg mass. After the first-stage juvenile emerges from the egg there are 3 or 4 molts, all of which occur in the soil. Males can be abundant or sparse depending on the species, which may suggest the presence of both parthenogenic and amphimictic species.

== Host parasite relationship ==
Xiphinema has a very wide host range including crops of high economic importance such as grape, hops and strawberry. Other documented hosts include: Nectarine, oak, rose, grapevine, raspberry, carrot, cherry, peach, and soybean.

== Bibliography ==
- Plant parasitic nematodes: Genus Xiphinema. University of North Carolina
- Yu He. Molecular approach to Longidoridae (Nematoda: Dorylaimida): organelle genomics, phylogeny, population diversity and diagnostics. Doctoral thesis, Applied Biological Sciences, University of Ghent 2003
