= Peach rosette mosaic virus =

Virus classification
- (unranked): Virus
- Realm: Riboviria
- Kingdom: Orthornavirae
- Phylum: Pisuviricota
- Class: Pisoniviricetes
- Order: Picornavirales
- Family: Secoviridae
- Genus: Nepovirus
- Species: Nepovirus persicae

Synonyms
- Peach rosette mosaic nepovirus

Species of virus

Peach rosette mosaic virus (PRMV) is a plant pathogenic virus of the family Secoviridae, infecting peaches and nectarines, and grapevine.
