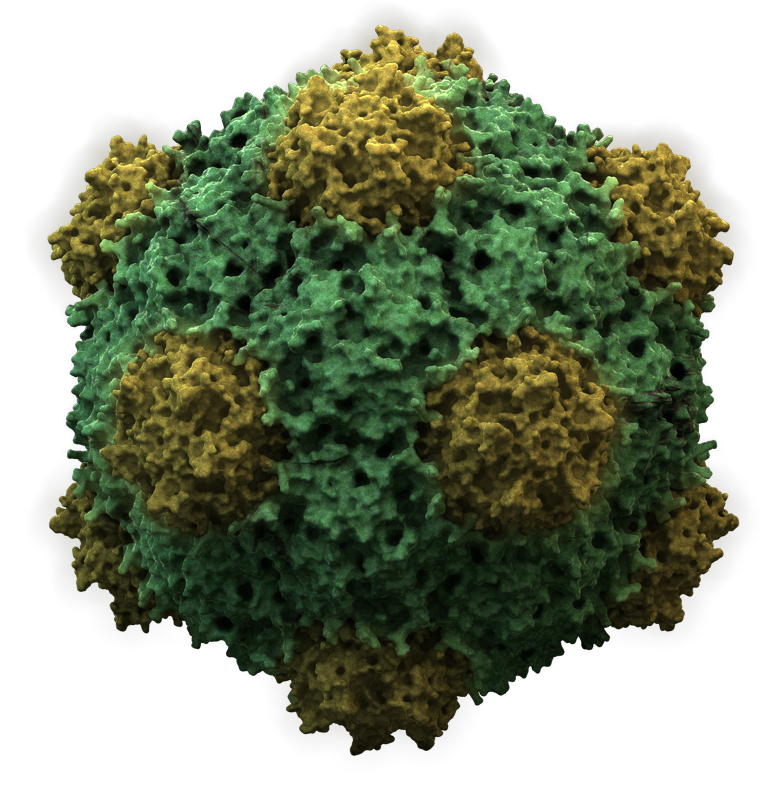
- Structure of the Cowpea Mosaic Virus based on PDB 2BFU

Virus classification
- (unranked): Virus
- Realm: Riboviria
- Kingdom: Orthornavirae
- Phylum: Pisuviricota
- Class: Pisoniviricetes
- Order: Picornavirales
- Family: Secoviridae
- Subfamily: Comovirinae

Genera
- See text

= Comovirinae =

Subfamily of viruses

Comovirinae is a subfamily of viruses in the order Picornavirales, in the family Secoviridae; its genera were formerly classified in the family Comoviridae. Plants serve as natural hosts. The subfamily contains four genera.

== Taxonomy ==
The genera Comovirus, Nepovirus and Fabavirus were classified into the family Comoviridae in 1993. This family was classified as part of the order Picornavirales when this order was created (2008), and its genera were reclassified as the subfamily Comovirinae of the family Secoviridae in 2009.

The subfamily contains the following genera:

- Comovirus
- Fabavirus
- Mersevirus
- Nepovirus

== Structure ==
Viruses in Comovirinae are non-enveloped, with icosahedral geometries, and T=pseudo3 symmetry. The diameter is around 30 nm. Genome segments are encapsidated separately into two different types of particle similar in size. Genomes are linear and segmented, bipartite, around 24-7kb in length.

Genus	Structure	Symmetry	Capsid	Genomic arrangement	Genomic segmentation
Comovirus	Icosahedral	Pseudo T=3	Non-enveloped	Linear	Segmented
Nepovirus	Icosahedral	Pseudo T=3	Non-enveloped	Linear	Segmented
Fabavirus	Icosahedral	Pseudo T=3	Non-enveloped	Linear	Segmented

== Life cycle ==
Viral replication is cytoplasmic. Entry into the host cell is achieved by penetration into the host cell. Replication follows the positive stranded RNA virus replication model. Positive stranded RNA virus transcription is the method of transcription. The virus exits the host cell by tubule-guided viral movement. Plants serve as the natural host. Transmission routes are mechanical.

Genus	Host details	Tissue tropism	Entry details	Release details	Replication site	Assembly site	Transmission
Comovirus	Plants	None	Viral movement; mechanical inoculation	Viral movement	Cytoplasm	Cytoplasm	Mechanical inoculation: beetles
Nepovirus	Plants	None	Viral movement; mechanical inoculation	Viral movement	Cytoplasm	Cytoplasm	Nematodes; mites; thrips
Fabavirus	Plants	None	Viral movement; mechanical inoculation	Viral movement	Cytoplasm	Cytoplasm	Mechanical inoculation: aphids
