= Transmission of plant viruses =

Transmission of plant viruses is the movement of plant viruses between organisms.

== Background ==
Viruses are known to infect both plant cells and animal cells. Since viruses are obligate intracellular parasites they must develop direct methods of transmission, between hosts, in order to survive. The mobility of animals increases the mechanisms of viral transmission that have evolved, whereas plants remain immobile, and thus plant viruses must rely on environmental factors to be transmitted between hosts.

== Natural transmission between plant hosts ==
The structural differences between plant and animal cells have resulted in a variety of transmission routes being exploited, enabling the virus to be passed between different host plants. The main difference, from the point of view of a virus, is the cell wall. This forms a tough barrier between the intracellular components and the extracellular environment, which has to be penetrated. These differences, combined with the fact that plants are immobile, have resulted in plant viruses relying on the wind and soil to transmit seeds as well as vectors. Vectors either transmit the virus propagative transmission, which results in an amplification of the virus by replication within the cells of the vector, or non-propagative transmission which simply carries the virus between the plants without viral replication. Common vectors include bacteria, fungi, nematodes, arthropods and arachnids.

Furthermore, human intervention, including grafting and experimental mechanical damage, physically damages the cell wall, contributes to the array of transmission routes. The virus commonly uses these methods to be passed from one host to another. However, the virus is dependent upon physical damage, generated naturally by the wind and feeding of vectors or by human intervention.

== Transmission between plant cells ==
Viral infections often develop into systemic infections as a means of transmission. The virus often infects many tissues, if not the whole plant, where it can continue to replicate. There are a variety of methods the virus can use to spread throughout the organism but the most common route use the vascular system, otherwise known as the xylem and phloem, and the plasmodesmata, which interconnect adjacent cells.

Nevertheless, the rigidity of the cell wall of plant cells, not only poses a problem for transmission of the viruses between different plant hosts, but also acts to prevent viral transmission between cells. Consequently, the virus must modify the plasmodesmata as they, themselves, are too large to fit through the small and tightly regulated plant structure. There are again a variety of mechanisms used for this, which have evolved for different viruses. The main mechanisms involve expressing proteins which coat the virus and interact with the structure of the plasmodesmata. The array of proteins expressed by the different viruses may act differently but all achieve a similar goal, passage between adjacent cells.
