= Fabavirus =

Virus classification
- (unranked): Virus
- Realm: Riboviria
- Kingdom: Orthornavirae
- Phylum: Pisuviricota
- Class: Pisoniviricetes
- Order: Picornavirales
- Family: Secoviridae
- Subfamily: Comovirinae
- Genus: Fabavirus

Genus of viruses

Fabavirus is a genus of plant viruses (plant pathogens) in the order Picornavirales, in the family Secoviridae, in the subfamily Comovirinae. Plants serve as natural hosts. There are 18 species in this genus.

== Taxonomy ==
The genus contains the following species, listed by scientific name and followed by the exemplar virus of the species:

- Fabavirus alphaviciae, Broad bean wilt virus 1
- Fabavirus avii, Cherry virus F
- Fabavirus betaviciae, Broad bean wilt virus 2
- Fabavirus betavitis, Grapevine secovirus
- Fabavirus camphorae, Camphor tree fabavirus
- Fabavirus cirsii, Cirsium virus A
- Fabavirus cucurbitaceae, Cucurbit mild mosaic virus
- Fabavirus gentianae, Gentian mosaic virus
- Fabavirus gynostemmae, Gynostemma pentaphyllum secovirus
- Fabavirus lamii, Lamium mild mosaic virus
- Fabavirus multiflorum, Many-flowered stoneseed fabavirus
- Fabavirus persicae, Peach leaf pitting-associated virus A
- Fabavirus phipiperis, Black pepper virus F
- Fabavirus pruni, Prunus virus F
- Fabavirus reaumuriae, Reaumuria songarica fabavirus
- Fabavirus squamellariae, Squamellaria imberbis fabavirus
- Fabavirus vitis, Grapevine fabavirus
- Fabavirus yuccae, Yucca gloriosa secovirus

== Structure ==
Viruses in Fabavirus are non-enveloped, with icosahedral geometries, and T=pseudo3 symmetry. The diameter is around 28-30 nm. Genomes are linear and segmented, bipartite, around 23.4kb in length.

Genus	Structure	Symmetry	Capsid	Genomic arrangement	Genomic segmentation
Fabavirus	Icosahedral	Pseudo T=3	Non-enveloped	Linear	Segmented

== Life cycle ==
Viral replication is cytoplasmic. Entry into the host cell is achieved by penetration into the host cell. Replication follows the positive stranded RNA virus replication model. Positive stranded RNA virus transcription is the method of transcription. The virus exits the host cell by tubule-guided viral movement. Plants serve as the natural host. The virus is transmitted via a vector (aphid). Transmission routes are vector and mechanical.

Genus	Host details	Tissue tropism	Entry details	Release details	Replication site	Assembly site	Transmission
Fabavirus	Plants	None	Viral movement; mechanical inoculation	Viral movement	Cytoplasm	Cytoplasm	Mechanical inoculation: aphids

== History ==
Proposed in 1987, as the Fabavirus group, it was originally unassigned but given genus status in 1993 as a member of the Comoviridae, of the Picornavirales in 2008, and reached its current taxonomic status in 2009. There are seven species. The genus is named after the broad bean (Vicia faba).

== See also ==
- King, Andrew M. Q.; et al., eds. (2012). Virus taxonomy : classification and nomenclature of viruses : ninth report of the International Committee on Taxonomy of Viruses. London: Academic Press. p. 926. ISBN 978-0123846846.
