= Tobacco ringspot virus =

Virus classification
- (unranked): Virus
- Realm: Riboviria
- Kingdom: Orthornavirae
- Phylum: Pisuviricota
- Class: Pisoniviricetes
- Order: Picornavirales
- Family: Secoviridae
- Genus: Nepovirus
- Species: Nepovirus nicotianae

Species of virus

Tobacco ringspot virus (TRSV) is a plant pathogenic virus in the plant virus family Secoviridae. It is the type species of the genus Nepovirus. Nepoviruses are transmitted between plants by nematodes, thrips, mites, grasshoppers, and flea beetles. TRSV is also easily transmitted by sap inoculation and transmission in seeds has been reported. In recent cases it has also been shown to appear in bees, but no transmission to plants from bees has been noted.

TRSV was observed for the first time in tobacco fields in Virginia and described in 1927. It is an isometric particle with a bipartite RNA genome. The virus has a wide host range that includes field grown crops, ornamentals and weeds. Its name comes from its most common symptom being chlorotic ringspots on the leaves of infected plants. In some areas this virus has caused growers to stop growing affected crops.

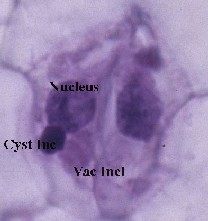
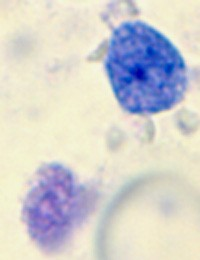
A. B. C.

Symptoms and virus inclusions of Tobacco ringspot nepovirus in the host Zamia furfuracea, the Cardboard Cycad. A. The first symptoms seen were chlorotic ringspots. With time they become necrotic. B. There are two types of inclusions found in leaf strips stained with Azure A (nucleic acid stain), one is vacuolate (Vac Inc) and the other more crystalloid (Cyst Inc - darker spots). C. Vacuolate inclusions only.

== See also ==
- Viral diseases of potato
