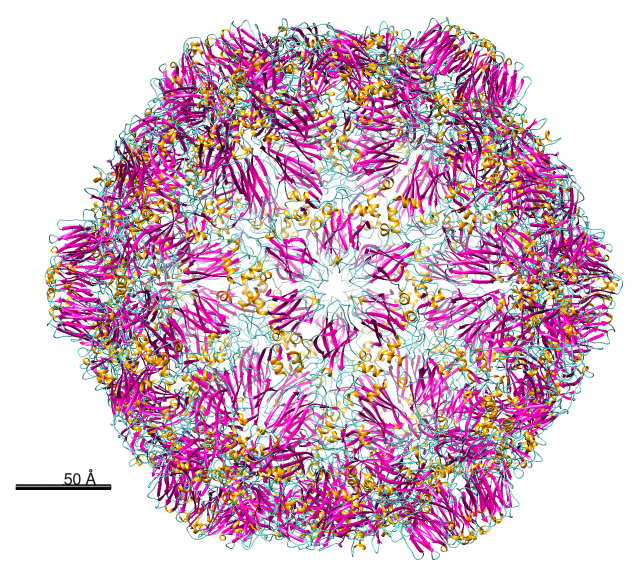
- Crystal structure of Grapevine fanleaf virus

Virus classification
- (unranked): Virus
- Realm: Riboviria
- Kingdom: Orthornavirae
- Phylum: Pisuviricota
- Class: Pisoniviricetes
- Order: Picornavirales
- Family: Secoviridae
- Subfamily: Comovirinae
- Genus: Nepovirus

Species
- See text

= Nepovirus =

Genus of viruses

Nepovirus is a genus of viruses in the order Picornavirales, in the family Secoviridae, in the subfamily Comovirinae. Plants serve as natural hosts. There are 78 species in this genus. Nepoviruses, unlike the genera Comovirus and Fabavirus in the subfamily Comovirinae, are transmitted by nematodes.

== Taxonomy ==
The genus contains the following species, listed by scientific name and followed by the exemplar virus of the species:

- Nepovirus aegaeum, Artichoke Aegean ringspot virus
- Nepovirus aeonii, Aeonium ringspot virus
- Nepovirus alphacucumis, Cucumber nepovirus A
- Nepovirus alphaparis, Paris nepovirus 1
- Nepovirus alphavitis, Grapevine nepovirus A
- Nepovirus anatoliense, Grapevine Anatolian ringspot virus
- Nepovirus anemones, Anemone nepovirus A
- Nepovirus arabis, Arabis mosaic virus
- Nepovirus armeniacae, Apricot latent ringspot virus
- Nepovirus arracaciae, Arracacha virus A
- Nepovirus astragali, Chinese milk vetch nepovirus
- Nepovirus avii, Cherry leaf roll virus
- Nepovirus begoniae, Begonia plebeja nepovirus
- Nepovirus beldersayense, Beldersay nepovirus 1
- Nepovirus berberidopsis, Coral plant nepovirus
- Nepovirus betae, Beet ringspot virus
- Nepovirus betaparis, Paris polyphylla secovirus 1
- Nepovirus betasolani, Potato virus B
- Nepovirus bulgariense, Grapevine Bulgarian latent virus
- Nepovirus caladeniae, Canberra spider orchid nepovirus
- Nepovirus cari, Caraway yellows virus
- Nepovirus carolinense, Horse nettle virus
- Nepovirus cenchri, Pearl millet nepovirus
- Nepovirus cerasiferae, Myrobalan latent ringspot virus
- Nepovirus chromusivum, Grapevine chrome mosaic virus
- Nepovirus chrysanthemi, Chrysanthemum nepovirus
- Nepovirus cichorii, Chicory yellow mottle virus
- Nepovirus cucumis, Melon mild mottle virus
- Nepovirus cycas, Cycas necrotic stunt virus
- Nepovirus cynarae, Artichoke yellow ringspot virus
- Nepovirus deformationis, Grapevine deformation virus
- Nepovirus foliumflabelli, Grapevine fanleaf virus
- Nepovirus fontinalis, Common water moss secovirus
- Nepovirus galax, Beetleweed nepovirus
- Nepovirus gentianae, Gentiana ecaudata nepovirus
- Nepovirus glycinis, Soybean latent spherical virus
- Nepovirus glycyrrhizae, Logan nepovirus
- Nepovirus hanseniae, Hansenia oviformis nepovirus
- Nepovirus hibisci, Hibiscus latent ringspot virus
- Nepovirus hypolepsis, Downy ground fern nepovirus
- Nepovirus italiaense, Artichoke Italian latent virus
- Nepovirus jasmini, Jasminum polyanthum nepovirus 1
- Nepovirus leucadendri, Cederberg conebush nepovirus
- Nepovirus lonchitis, Tomato fern secovirus
- Nepovirus lycopersici, Tomato ringspot virus
- Nepovirus maculanulatum, Mulberry ringspot virus
- Nepovirus manihotis, Cassava green mottle virus
- Nepovirus mirae, Prunus mira virus A
- Nepovirus mori, Mulberry mosaic leaf roll associated virus
- Nepovirus musae, Musa nepovirus
- Nepovirus myrtilli, Blueberry leaf mottle virus
- Nepovirus nicotianae, Tobacco ringspot virus
- Nepovirus nigranuli, Tomato black ring virus
- Nepovirus oleae, Olive latent ringspot virus
- Nepovirus paeoniae, Tibetan peony nepovirus
- Nepovirus persicae, Peach rosette mosaic virus
- Nepovirus petuniae, Petunia chlorotic mottle virus
- Nepovirus pholismae, Purple sand food nepovirus
- Nepovirus pinnatifolium, Senecio pinnatifolius nepovirus
- Nepovirus poaceae, Poaceae Liege nepovirus A
- Nepovirus pogonati, Aloe haircap nepovirus
- Nepovirus pratensis, Red clover nepovirus A
- Nepovirus rhododendri, Rhododendron lacteum nepovirus
- Nepovirus ribis, Blackcurrant reversion virus
- Nepovirus rubi, Raspberry ringspot virus
- Nepovirus saururi, Asian lizard's tail nepovirus
- Nepovirus sichuanense Green Sichuan pepper nepovirus
- Nepovirus silenis, Silene diclinis nepovirus
- Nepovirus solani, Potato black ringspot virus
- Nepovirus stenotaphri, Stenotaphrum nepovirus
- Nepovirus theobromatis, Cocoa necrosis virus
- Nepovirus thymi, Common thyme nepovirus
- Nepovirus trifolii, Crimson clover latent virus
- Nepovirus tunisiaense, Grapevine Tunisian ringspot virus
- Nepovirus usolani, Potato virus U
- Nepovirus vaccinii, Blueberry latent spherical virus
- Nepovirus vittariae, Shoestring fern secovirus
- Nepovirus yunnanense, Yunnan pine nepovirus

== Structure ==
Viruses in Nepovirus are non-enveloped, with icosahedral geometries, and T=pseudo3 symmetry. The diameter is around 28-30 nm. Genomes are linear and segmented, bipartite, around 23.9kb in length.

Genus	Structure	Symmetry	Capsid	Genomic arrangement	Genomic segmentation
Nepovirus	Icosahedral	Pseudo T=3	Non-enveloped	Linear	Segmented

== Life cycle ==
Viral replication is cytoplasmic. Entry into the host cell is achieved by penetration into the host cell. Replication follows the positive stranded RNA virus replication model. Positive stranded RNA virus transcription is the method of transcription. The virus exits the host cell by tubule-guided viral movement. Plants serve as the natural host. The virus is transmitted via a vector (nematodes, mite, and thrips). Transmission routes are vector.

Genus	Host details	Tissue tropism	Entry details	Release details	Replication site	Assembly site	Transmission
Nepovirus	Plants	None	Viral movement; mechanical inoculation	Viral movement	Cytoplasm	Cytoplasm	Nematodes; mites; thrips

== Genome ==
Nepoviruses are classified as type IV viruses under the Baltimore classification system, and consequently contain bipartite, linear, single stranded positive sense RNA genomes. The two genome segments are encapsulated separately into two different icosahedral particles. Each of the genome segments produces a different polypeptide, which undergoes a series of steps (i.e. proteolysis, and other post-translational modifications) in order to produce a functional protein.

=== RNA1 ===
The first segment (RNA1) is approximately 8,000 nucleotides in length and appears as a single copy in each B type virion. It encodes the proteins that are important in replication and is the first gene to be activated.

=== RNA2 ===
The second segment (RNA2) is approximately 4,000–7,000 nucleotides in length and usually appears as a single copy in each M type virion. It encodes the proteins that are important in cell-cell transmission and evasion of cellular defenses.

== See also ==
- Cassava American latent virus
- Lucerne Australian latent virus
