= Longidoridae =

Scientific classification
- Domain: Eukaryota
- Kingdom: Animalia
- Phylum: Nematoda
- Class: Enoplea
- Order: Dorylaimida
- Suborder: Dorylaimina
- Superfamily: Dorylaimoidea
- Family: Longidoridae; Thorne, 1935

Family of roundworms

Longidoridae (longidorid nematodes) is a family of polyphagous root ectoparasites in the phylum Nematoda (nematodes) with a worldwide distribution.

== Taxonomy ==
There are about 720 species divided amongst seven genera in the family, which is further subdivided into subfamilies and tribes.

=== Subdivision ===
Subfamilies;

- Longidorinae (480 spp.)
- Xiphineminae (240 spp.)

Tribes;

- Subfamily Longidorinae
  - Longidorini
  - Xiphidorini
- Subfamily Xiphineminae

=== Genera ===
- Subfamily Longidorinae
  - Tribe Longidorini
    - Longidorus (144 spp.)
    - Longidoroides (13 spp.)
    - Paralongidorus (72 spp.)
  - Tribe Xiphidorini
    - Australodorus (1 sp.)
    - Paraxiphidorus (3 spp.)
    - Xiphidorus (8 spp.)
- Subfamily Xiphineminae
    - Xiphinema (some 240 spp.)

== Pathology ==
With the Trichodoridae, the Longidoridae form the two Enoplea nematode families known to be plant parasites, though from different subclasses, and the only virus vectors (particularly nepoviruses) in phylum Nematoda.

== Bibliography ==
- R. T. Robbins and D. J. F. Brown (March 1996). "Descriptions of Three New Longidorus Species from Alaska (Nematoda: Longidoridae)". J Nematol. 28 (1): 83–93. PMC 2619677. PMID 19277349.
- Lee, Donald L, ed. (2010). The biology of nematodes. London: Taylor & Francis. ISBN 978-0415272117.
- Ahmad, Wasim; Jairajpuri, M. Shamim (1992). Dorylaimida : free-living, predaceous and plant-parasitic Nematodes. Leiden: E.J. Brill. ISBN 9004092293.
