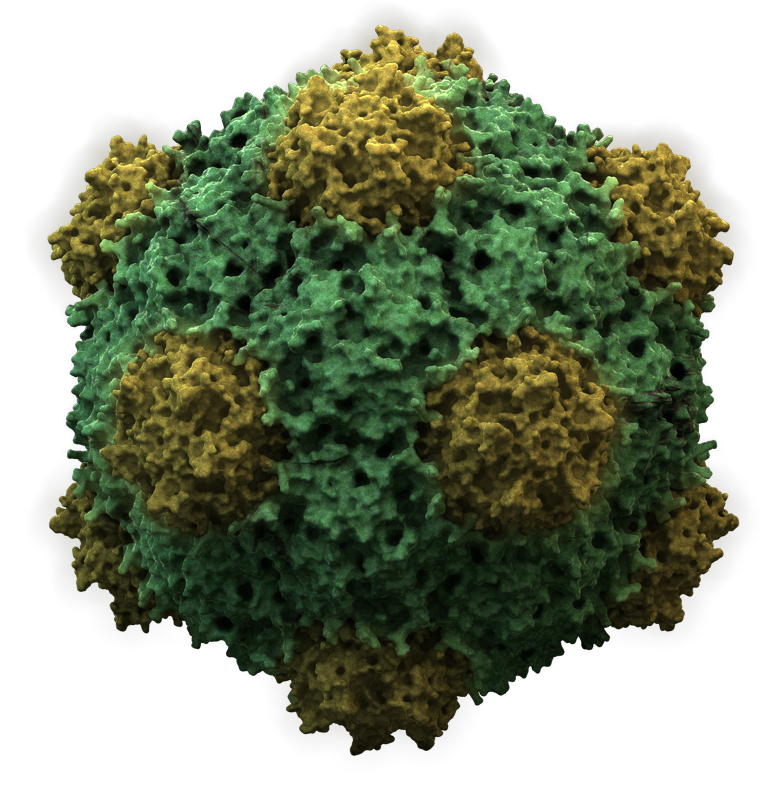
- Structure of Cowpea mosaic virus based on PDB 2BFU

Virus classification
- (unranked): Virus
- Realm: Riboviria
- Kingdom: Orthornavirae
- Phylum: Pisuviricota
- Class: Pisoniviricetes
- Order: Picornavirales
- Family: Secoviridae

Genera
- See text

= Secoviridae =

Family of viruses

Secoviridae is a family of viruses in the order Picornavirales. Plants serve as natural hosts. There are 10 genera in the family, four of which are assigned to a subfamily. The family was created in 2009 with the grouping of families Sequiviridae, now dissolved, and Comoviridae, now subfamily Comovirinae, along with the then unassigned genera Cheravirus, Sadwavirus, and Torradovirus.

== Taxonomy ==
The family includes the following genera (-virinae denotes subfamily and -virus denotes genus):

- Comovirinae
  - Comovirus
  - Fabavirus
  - Mersevirus
  - Nepovirus
- Unassigned to a subfamily:
  - Cheravirus
  - Sadwavirus
  - Sequivirus
  - Stralarivirus
    - Strawberry latent ringspot virus
  - Torradovirus
  - Waikavirus

== Structure ==
Viruses in Secoviridae are non-enveloped, with icosahedral geometries, and T=pseudo3 symmetry. The diameter is around 25-30 nm. Genomes are linear and segmented, bipartite, around 24-7kb in length.

Genus	Structure	Symmetry	Capsid	Genomic arrangement	Genomic segmentation
Sequivirus	Icosahedral	Pseudo T=3	Non-enveloped	Linear	Monopartite
Sadwavirus	Icosahedral	Pseudo T=3	Non-enveloped	Linear	Segmented
Nepovirus	Icosahedral	Pseudo T=3	Non-enveloped	Linear	Segmented
Fabavirus	Icosahedral	Pseudo T=3	Non-enveloped	Linear	Segmented
Comovirus	Icosahedral	Pseudo T=3	Non-enveloped	Linear	Segmented
Cheravirus	Icosahedral	Pseudo T=3	Non-enveloped	Linear	Segmented
Torradovirus	Icosahedral	Pseudo T=3	Non-enveloped	Linear	Segmented
Waikavirus	Icosahedral	Pseudo T=3	Non-enveloped	Linear	Monopartite

== Life cycle ==
Viral replication is cytoplasmic. Entry into the host cell is achieved by penetration into the host cell. Replication follows the positive stranded RNA virus replication model. Positive stranded RNA virus transcription is the method of transcription. The virus exits the host cell by tubule-guided viral movement. Plants serve as the natural host. Transmission routes are mechanical.

Genus	Host details	Tissue tropism	Entry details	Release details	Replication site	Assembly site	Transmission
Sequivirus	Plants	None	Viral movement; mechanical inoculation	Viral movement	Cytoplasm	Cytoplasm	Mechanical inoculation: aphids; Mechanical inoculation: Cavariella aegopodii; Mechanical inoculation: Cavariella pastinacae
Sadwavirus	Plants	None	Viral movement; mechanical inoculation	Viral movement	Cytoplasm	Cytoplasm	Nematodes; mites; thrips
Nepovirus	Plants	None	Viral movement; mechanical inoculation	Viral movement	Cytoplasm	Cytoplasm	Nematodes; mites; thrips
Fabavirus	Plants	None	Viral movement; mechanical inoculation	Viral movement	Cytoplasm	Cytoplasm	Mechanical inoculation: aphids
Comovirus	Plants	None	Viral movement; mechanical inoculation	Viral movement	Cytoplasm	Cytoplasm	Mechanical inoculation: beetles
Cheravirus	Plants	None	Viral movement; mechanical inoculation	Viral movement	Cytoplasm	Cytoplasm	Nematodes; mites; thrips
Torradovirus	Plants	None	Viral movement; mechanical inoculation	Viral movement	Cytoplasm	Cytoplasm	Unknown
Waikavirus	Gramineae	Phloem; phloem parenchyma; bundle sheath	Viral movement	Viral movement	Cytoplasm	Cytoplasm	Mechanical innocuation: aphids; mechanical innocuation: leafhoppers

== Evolution ==
The subfamily Comovirinae evolved ~1,000 years ago with extant species diversifying between 50 and 250 years ago. This time period coincides with the intensification of agricultural practices in industrial societies.

The mutation rate has been estimated to be 9.29×10^{−3} to 2.74×10^{−3} subs/site/year.
