= Duck hepatitis virus =

Virus classification
- (unranked): Virus
- Realm: Riboviria
- Kingdom: Orthornavirae
- Phylum: Pisuviricota
- Class: Pisoniviricetes
- Order: Picornavirales
- Family: Picornaviridae
- Genus: Avihepatovirus
- Species: Avihepatovirus A
- Virus: Duck hepatitis virus I, Ia, II, III

Duck hepatitis is an acute and fatal disease in ducklings caused by the Avihepatovirus DHV-1 and DHV-3. It causes opisthotonus and hepatitis. DHV-1 is found worldwide. It causes disease in young ducklings, usually <6 weeks of age and spreads rapidly within a flock. It is the most virulent of the DHV species. DHV-3 has only been reported in the USA.

== Virus ==
DHV-1, is a Picornavirus that is distributed all over the world. It has significant impact on the poultry industry. It was first recorded in 1949 in Long Island, New York. In 2006 the pathogen's genome was determined. This genome is composed of 7691 nucleotides and encodes and polyprotein of 2250 amino acids.

Duck hepatitis virus, DHV, type 1 (DHV-1), type 1a (DHV-1a), type 2 (DHV-2), and type 3 (DHV-3) are the four types of viruses that can cause disease in ducks. The pathology and pathogenicity between duck hepatitis virus type 1 and type 1a is, in essence, the same as one another.

Duck Hepatitis is a Class B disease listed by the Office des International Epizooties. The virus cannot infect humans.

Duck hepatitis virus type 1 is classified as an enterovirus, DHV-2 is an astrovirus, and DHV-3 as a picornavirus. DHV-1 has the most significant economic effect due to its high mortality rate when the spread is not controlled. The virion of DHV-1 is a 20-40 nm diameter, non-enveloped, icosahedral particle. It is resistant to ether and chloroform. It possesses the ability to survive under normal environmental conditions for extended periods.

== Clinical signs and diagnosis ==
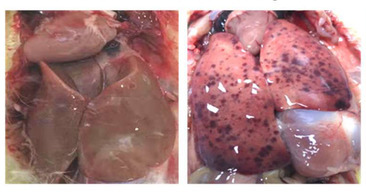
Healthy duck liver (left) compared to one from a duck infected by DHAV-1, with visible haemorrhaging

Clinical signs include sudden death, opisthotonus, paresis, paralysis and enophthalmos. DHV-1 infection is most virulent, with death occurring within 1–2 hours of clinical signs.

A preliminary diagnosis may be made based on the clinical signs and post-mortem examination. Autopsy should show an enlarged liver, which appears greenish and displays distinct ecchymotic haemorrhages. Inoculation and direct immunofluorescence can be used to definitively diagnose DHV-1.

== Treatment and control ==
No treatment is effective once infected.

To prevent the disease, vaccination (ATCvet code QI01) is commercially available against DHV-1 and immunization involves two or three inoculations. Additionally, DHV-1 can be prevented by strict isolation in the first 4–5 weeks of life. 5% phenol and formaldehyde can be used to inactivate the viruses in the environment.

== See also ==
- Duck Hepatitis B Virus
