= Erbovirus =

Virus classification
- (unranked): Virus
- Realm: Riboviria
- Kingdom: Orthornavirae
- Phylum: Pisuviricota
- Class: Pisoniviricetes
- Order: Picornavirales
- Family: Picornaviridae
- Genus: Erbovirus
- Species: Erbovirus aequirhi

Genus of viruses

Erbovirus is a genus of viruses in the order Picornavirales, in the family Picornaviridae. Horses serve as natural hosts. There is only one species in this genus: Erbovirus A1, also called Equine rhinitis B virus 1 (Erbovirus aequirhi). Diseases associated with this genus include: upper respiratory tract disease with viremia and fecal shedding. Viruses belonging to the genus Erbovirus have been isolated in horses with acute upper febrile respiratory disease. The structure of the Erbovirus virion is icosahedral, having a diameter of 27–30 nm.

== Physical characteristics ==
Viruses in Erbovirus are non-enveloped, with icosahedral, spherical, and round geometries, and T=pseudo3 symmetry. The diameter is around 30 nm. Genomes are linear and non-segmented, around 8.8kb in length.

The virion essentially is a nucleocapsid that is visible under an electron microscope and is able to infect cultured cells from a broad range of mammals including rabbit kidney (RK13), African green monkey kidney (Vero), equine foetal kidney (EFK), and is able to infect humans.

The RNA genome of the virion is inside the capsid that is composed by twelve capsomers, which are cup-shaped pentamers.

The erbovirus particles are non-enveloped and the molecular mass of the virions is around (8–9)×10^{6} daltons. They are resistant to inactivation by non-ionic detergent treatment.

Erbovirus, as a typical picornavirus, has a single-stranded positive-sense RNA genome. A feature of the picornavirus genome is the virus protein that is linked at the 5’ end of the genome, known as "VPg" (Virus-Protein-attached-to-the-Genome). In addition, the 3’ end of the genome has a poly-A tail. The transcription of the erbovirus genome gives rise to a polyprotein which is further more processed and cleaved to give the mature viral proteins, in order from 5' to 3' : L ("Leader"), VP4, VP2, VP3, VP1, 2A, 2B, 2C, 3A (Vpg), 3B, 3C^{pro}, 3D^{pol}.

The only species of the genus Erbovirus is equine rhinitis B virus which was recently found to have three phylogenetically distinct serotypes, equine rhinitis B virus (ERBV)-1, ERBV-2 and ERBV-3. One such phylogenetic group was found to comprise mostly "acid stable" virus isolates, surviving pH 3.6 for 1 hour at room temperature.

Genus	Structure	Symmetry	Capsid	Genomic arrangement	Genomic segmentation
Erbovirus	Icosahedral	Pseudo T=3	Non-enveloped	Linear	Monopartite

== Life cycle ==
Viral replication is cytoplasmic. Entry into the host cell is achieved by attachment of the virus to host receptors, which mediates endocytosis. Replication follows the positive stranded RNA virus replication model. Positive stranded RNA virus transcription is the method of transcription. Translation takes place by ribosomal skipping. The virus exits the host cell by lysis, and viroporins. Horses serve as the natural host.

Genus	Host details	Tissue tropism	Entry details	Release details	Replication site	Assembly site	Transmission
Erbovirus	Horse	None	Cell receptor endocytosis	Lysis	Cytoplasm	Cytoplasm	Contact

== Epidemiology ==
ERBV's appear to infect most foals and weanlings, eliciting a low serum antibody response in stark contrast to equine rhinitis A virus (ERAV), which is the only species of the genus Aphthovirus that is not a foot-and-mouth disease virus (FMDV), and appears to only infect horses once they begin training for racing (approx. 2 years old). ERAV enters the blood and elicits a very high serum antibody response that seems to then limit the spread of the virus by herd immunity, given that only approximately 40% of horses have detectable ERAV antibody. The low serum antibody response of ERBV appears to allow the continual, seasonal re-infection of horses. Horses are also known to shed ERBV for up to two years, possibly more.

== See also ==
- Acid-stable equine picornavirus
