= Turkey viral hepatitis =

Turkey hepatitis virus

Virus classification
- (unranked): Virus
- Realm: Riboviria
- Kingdom: Orthornavirae
- Phylum: Pisuviricota
- Class: Pisoniviricetes
- Order: Picornavirales
- Family: Picornaviridae
- Genus: Avihepatovirus
- Species: Avihepatovirus ahepati
- Virus: Turkey hepatitis virus

Viral disease of turkeys

The aetiological agent of turkey viral hepatitis is a virus from the Picornaviridae family.

The disease is restricted to turkeys and is highly contagious but usually subclinical. It is usually present in young birds under the age of 6 weeks.

It has been seen in Canada, Italy, the US and the UK.

Transmission is thought to be via the faeces and vertical transmission may also occur.

== Clinical signs and diagnosis ==
Affected turkeys may show systemic signs such as anorexia, lethargy and death. Hepatic encephalopathy occurs secondary to liver involvement.

Egg hatching and production can be affected.

Diagnosis relies on the isolation of the virus from samples of internal organs or the faeces inoculated into embryonated chicken eggs.

The main necropsy findings are multiple necrotic lesions on the liver and sometimes the spleen.

== Treatment and control ==
There is no specific treatment for the condition.

Control may rely on boosting bird immunity, preventing group mixing and faecal spreading.
