= Acid-stable equine picornavirus =

Virus classification
- (unranked): Virus
- Realm: Riboviria
- Kingdom: Orthornavirae
- Phylum: Pisuviricota
- Class: Pisoniviricetes
- Order: Picornavirales
- Family: Picornaviridae
- Genus: Erbovirus
- Species: Erbovirus A
- Virus: Acid-stable equine picornavirus

Virus

Acid-stable equine picornavirus (EqPV) is a member virus of Erbovirus A in the family Picornaviridae. They were isolated in the UK and Japan, from nasal swabs of horses with acute febrile respiratory disease.

The Erbovirus genus includes three serotypes: ERBV1, ERBV2 and ERBV3.
