= Salivirus =

Virus classification
- (unranked): Virus
- Realm: Riboviria
- Kingdom: Orthornavirae
- Phylum: Pisuviricota
- Class: Pisoniviricetes
- Order: Picornavirales
- Family: Picornaviridae
- Genus: Salivirus
- Species: Salivirus aklasse

Genus of viruses

Salivirus is a genus of viruses in the order Picornavirales, in the family Picornaviridae. Humans and chimpanzees serve as natural hosts. There is only one species in this genus: Salivirus A (Salivirus aklasse).

== Structure ==
Viruses in Salivirus are non-enveloped, with icosahedral and spherical geometries, and T=pseudo3 symmetry. The diameter is around 30 nm. Genomes are linear and non-segmented, around 6-8kb in length.

| Genus | Structure | Symmetry | Capsid | Genomic arrangement | Genomic segmentation |
|---|---|---|---|---|---|
| Salivirus | Icosahedral | Pseudo T=3 | Non-enveloped | Linear | Monopartite |

== Life cycle ==
Viral replication is cytoplasmic. Entry into the host cell is achieved by attachment of the virus to host receptors, which mediates endocytosis. Replication follows the positive stranded RNA virus replication model. Positive stranded RNA virus transcription is the method of transcription. The virus exits the host cell by lysis, and viroporins.

| Genus | Host details | Tissue tropism | Entry details | Release details | Replication site | Assembly site | Transmission |
|---|---|---|---|---|---|---|---|
| Salivirus | Human, chimpanzee | None | Cell receptor endocytosis | Lysis | Cytoplasm | Cytoplasm | Unknown |

== Pathogenesis ==
The virus has been isolated from diarrheal specimens. But the role of the virus in the pathogenesis of gastroenteritis was ambiguous. Meta-analysis showed that the virus is not associated with gastroenteritis.
