= Passerivirus =

Virus classification
- (unranked): Virus
- Realm: Riboviria
- Kingdom: Orthornavirae
- Phylum: Pisuviricota
- Class: Pisoniviricetes
- Order: Picornavirales
- Family: Picornaviridae
- Genus: Passerivirus

Genus of viruses

Passerivirus is a genus of viruses in the order Picornavirales, in the family Picornaviridae. Birds serve as natural hosts. There are two species in this genus: Passerivirus A and a second, novel passerivirus that was discovered in 2018 in a population of Hungarian home-reared finches, where it achieved an over 50 percent mortality rate.

== Taxonomy ==
The genus contains the following species, listed by scientific name and followed by the exemplar virus of the species:

- Passerivirus ahokothi; Passerivirus A1
- Passerivirus bewaxi; Passerivirus B1, also called Waxbill passerivirus

== Structure ==
Viruses in Passerivirus are non-enveloped, with icosahedral and Spherical geometries, and T=pseudo3 symmetry. The diameter is around 30 nm. Genomes are linear and non-segmented, around 8kb in length.

Genus	Structure	Symmetry	Capsid	Genomic arrangement	Genomic segmentation
Passerivirus	Icosahedral	Pseudo T=3	Non-enveloped	Linear	Monopartite

== Life cycle ==
Viral replication is cytoplasmic. Entry into the host cell is achieved by attachment of the virus to host receptors, which mediates endocytosis. Replication follows the positive stranded RNA virus replication model. Positive stranded RNA virus transcription is the method of transcription. The virus exits the host cell by lysis, and viroporins. Birds serve as the natural host.

Genus	Host details	Tissue tropism	Entry details	Release details	Replication site	Assembly site	Transmission
Passerivirus	Birds	None	Cell receptor endocytosis	Lysis	Cytoplasm	Cytoplasm	Unknown
