= Parabovirus =

Virus classification
- (unranked): Virus
- Realm: Riboviria
- Kingdom: Orthornavirae
- Phylum: Pisuviricota
- Class: Pisoniviricetes
- Order: Picornavirales
- Family: Picornaviridae
- Subfamily: Ensavirinae
- Genus: Parabovirus

Genus of viruses

Parabovirus, belonging to the Picornaviridae family, is a genus of viruses that has been detected in Laxmann's shrew (Sorex caecutiens), a shrew with a wide range, spanning from Scandinavia over Siberia to Northeastern China. Shrews are of special interest to epidemiologists studying zoonoses, as the shrew habitats often overlap with livestock.

Several species have been found in shrews that live in coastal Eastern China, for example in Zhejiang province.

The ICTV's taxonomy accepts three species of Parabovirus:

- Parabovirus anorrati
- Parabovirus bechstihams
- Parabovirus chiwhibe
