= Teschovirus =

Virus classification
- (unranked): Virus
- Realm: Riboviria
- Kingdom: Orthornavirae
- Phylum: Pisuviricota
- Class: Pisoniviricetes
- Order: Picornavirales
- Family: Picornaviridae
- Genus: Teschovirus

Genus of viruses

Teschovirus is a genus of viruses in the order Picornavirales, in the family Picornaviridae. Pigs serve as natural hosts. There are two species in this genus, including Porcine teschovirus, which is responsible for the porcine enteroviral encephalomyelitis disease caused in pigs. The genus name comes from this species and the disease it causes: Teschen disease (a severe and fatal form of pig encephalomyelitis), which itself was named for the town Teschen in Poland/Czechoslovakia where the disease was first recognised in 1929.

== Genome ==
Teschovirus has a single-stranded, linear, non-segmented RNA genome. The RNA genome is positively sensed meaning that it has the same polarity as the mRNA and no reverse transcription is necessary. The size of the genome is between 7000 and 9000 nucleotides long. In addition the virus genome contains at the 5' end a protein called VPg and the 3' end is polyadenylated. Through translation of the genome a polyprotein is produced. It is later cleaved in order to give twelve proteins. These proteins are nucleoproteins, non-structural proteins, a polymerase, proteases like the leader protein and the genome linked-protein.

== Taxonomy ==
The genus contains the following species:

- Teschovirus asilesi; Teschovirus A, also called Porcine teschovirus
- Teschovirus bishikawa, Teschovirus B

== Structure ==
Viruses in Teschovirus are non-enveloped, with icosahedral, spherical, and round geometries, and T=pseudo3 symmetry. The diameter is around 30 nm.

Genus	Structure	Symmetry	Capsid	Genomic arrangement	Genomic segmentation
Teschovirus	Icosahedral	Pseudo T=3	Non-enveloped	Linear	Monopartite

== Life cycle ==
Viral replication is cytoplasmic. Entry into the host cell is achieved by attachment of the virus to host receptors, which mediates endocytosis. Replication follows the positive stranded RNA virus replication model. Positive stranded RNA virus transcription is the method of transcription. Translation takes place by ribosomal skipping. The virus exits the host cell by lysis, and viroporins. Pig serve as the natural host. Transmission routes are fecal-oral.

Genus	Host details	Tissue tropism	Entry details	Release details	Replication site	Assembly site	Transmission
Teschovirus	Swine	Gastrointestinal tract; CNS	Cell receptor endocytosis	Lysis	Cytoplasm	Cytoplasm	Oral-fecal
