= Mischivirus =

Virus classification
- (unranked): Virus
- Realm: Riboviria
- Kingdom: Orthornavirae
- Phylum: Pisuviricota
- Class: Pisoniviricetes
- Order: Picornavirales
- Family: Picornaviridae
- Genus: Mischivirus

Genus of viruses

Mischivirus is a genus of viruses in the order Picornavirales, in the family Picornaviridae. Bats serve as natural hosts. There are five species in this genus.

== Taxonomy ==
The genus contains the following species, listed by scientific name and followed by the exemplar virus of the species:

- Mischivirus acombewi; Mischivirus A1, also called Minopterus schreibersii picornavirus
- Mischivirus beminio; Mischivirus B1, also called Bat picornavirus
- Mischivirus cica; Mischivirus C1, also called African bat icavirus
- Mischivirus defoxi; Mischivirus D1, also called Canine picornavirus
- Mischivirus ehoushre; Mischivirus E1, also called Suncus murinus mischivirus

== Structure ==
Viruses in Mischivirus are non-enveloped, with icosahedral, spherical, and round geometries, and T=pseudo3 symmetry. The diameter is around 30 nm. Genomes are linear and non-segmented, around 8.5kb in length.

| Genus | Structure | Symmetry | Capsid | Genomic arrangement | Genomic segmentation |
|---|---|---|---|---|---|
| Mischivirus | Icosahedral | Pseudo T=3 | Non-enveloped | Linear | Monopartite |

== Life cycle ==
Viral replication is cytoplasmic. Entry into the host cell is achieved by attachment of the virus to host receptors, which mediates endocytosis. Replication follows the positive stranded RNA virus replication model. Positive stranded RNA virus transcription is the method of transcription. Translation takes place by ribosomal skipping. The virus exits the host cell by lysis, and viroporins. Bats serve as the natural host.

| Genus | Host details | Tissue tropism | Entry details | Release details | Replication site | Assembly site | Transmission |
|---|---|---|---|---|---|---|---|
| Mischivirus | Bats | None | Cell receptor endocytosis | Lysis | Cytoplasm | Cytoplasm | Unknown |
