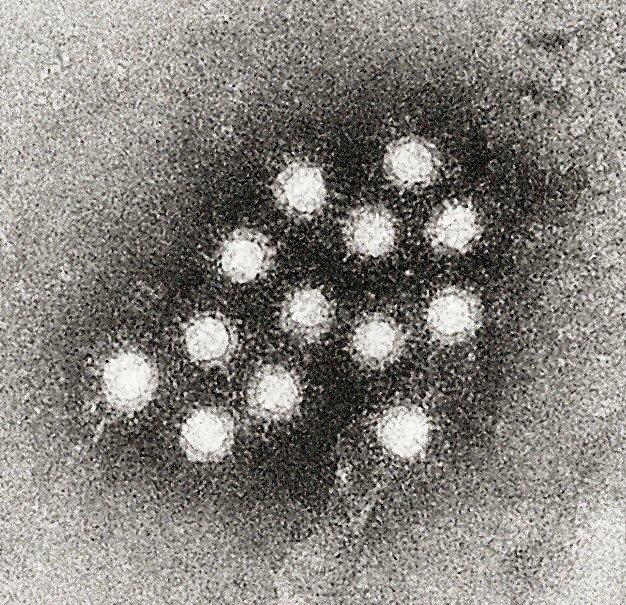
- Electron micrograph of Hepatitis A virus virions

Virus classification
- (unranked): Virus
- Realm: Riboviria
- Kingdom: Orthornavirae
- Phylum: Pisuviricota
- Class: Pisoniviricetes
- Order: Picornavirales
- Family: Picornaviridae
- Subfamily: Heptrevirinae
- Genus: Hepatovirus

= Hepatovirus =

Genus of viruses

Hepatovirus is a genus of viruses. The genus has nine species, including Hepatitis A virus, which is the causative agent of hepatitis A.

== Taxonomy ==
The genus contains the following species, listed by scientific name and followed by the exemplar virus of the species:

- Hepatovirus ahepa; Hepatovirus A1, commonly called Hepatitis A virus
- Hepatovirus bephopi; Hepatovirus B1, also called Phopivirus
- Hepatovirus cemanavi; Hepatovirus C1, also called Bat hepatovirus
- Hepatovirus devoli; Hepatovirus D1, also called Rodent hepatovirus
- Hepatovirus erubebrufu; Hepatovirus E1, also called Rodent hepatovirus
- Hepatovirus fejalco; Hepatovirus F1, also called Rodent hepatovirus
- Hepatovirus gafrisheta; Hepatovirus G1, also called Bat hepatovirus
- Hepatovirus hedgi; Hepatovirus H1, also called Hedgehog hepatovirus
- Hepatovirus ishrewi; Hepatovirus I1, also called Shrew hepatovirus
