= Hunnivirus =

Virus classification
- (unranked): Virus
- Realm: Riboviria
- Kingdom: Orthornavirae
- Phylum: Pisuviricota
- Class: Pisoniviricetes
- Order: Picornavirales
- Family: Picornaviridae
- Genus: Hunnivirus
- Species: Hunnivirus amagyari

Genus of viruses

Hunnivirus is a genus of viruses in the order Picornavirales, in the family Picornaviridae. Cattle serve as natural hosts. There is only one species in this genus: Hunnivirus amagyari.

== Structure ==
Viruses in Hunnivirus are non-enveloped, with icosahedral, spherical, and round geometries, and T=pseudo3 symmetry. The diameter is around 28 nm. Genomes are linear and non-segmented, around 7.5kb in length.

| Genus | Structure | Symmetry | Capsid | Genomic arrangement | Genomic segmentation |
|---|---|---|---|---|---|
| Hunnivirus | Icosahedral | Pseudo T=3 | Non-enveloped | Linear | Monopartite |

== Life cycle ==
Viral replication is cytoplasmic. Entry into the host cell is achieved by attachment of the virus to host receptors, which mediates endocytosis. Replication follows the positive stranded RNA virus replication model. Positive stranded RNA virus transcription is the method of transcription. Translation takes place by ribosomal skipping. The virus exits the host cell by lysis, and viroporins. Cattle serve as the natural host.

| Genus | Host details | Tissue tropism | Entry details | Release details | Replication site | Assembly site | Transmission |
|---|---|---|---|---|---|---|---|
| Hunnivirus | Cattle | None | Cell receptor endocytosis | Lysis | Cytoplasm | Cytoplasm | Unknown |
