= Mosavirus =

Virus classification
- (unranked): Virus
- Realm: Riboviria
- Kingdom: Orthornavirae
- Phylum: Pisuviricota
- Class: Pisoniviricetes
- Order: Picornavirales
- Family: Picornaviridae
- Genus: Mosavirus

Genus of viruses

Mosavirus is a genus of viruses in the order Picornavirales, in the family Picornaviridae. Canyon mouse serve as natural hosts. There are two species in this genus.

== Taxonomy ==
The genus contains the following species, listed by scientific name and followed by the exemplar virus of the species:

- Mosavirus acanmo; Mosavirus A1
- Mosavirus betibeti; Mosavirus B1, also called Marmot mosavirus

== Structure ==
Viruses in Mosavirus are non-enveloped, with icosahedral, spherical, and round geometries, and T=pseudo3 symmetry. The diameter is around 30 nm. Genomes are linear, around 8.4kb in length.

Genus	Structure	Symmetry	Capsid	Genomic arrangement	Genomic segmentation
Mosavirus	Icosahedral	Pseudo T=3	Non-enveloped	Linear	Monopartite

== Life cycle ==
Viral replication is cytoplasmic. Entry into the host cell is achieved by attachment of the virus to host receptors, which mediates endocytosis. Replication follows the positive stranded RNA virus replication model. Positive stranded RNA virus transcription is the method of transcription. Translation takes place by ribosomal skipping. The virus exits the host cell by lysis, and viroporins. Canyon mouse serve as the natural host.

Genus	Host details	Tissue tropism	Entry details	Release details	Replication site	Assembly site	Transmission
Mosavirus	Canyon mouse	None	Cell receptor endocytosis	Lysis	Cytoplasm	Cytoplasm	Unknown
