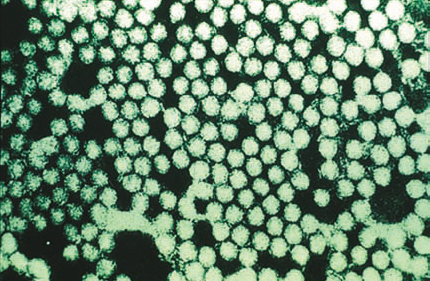
- Electronmicrograph of foot-and-mouth disease virus

Virus classification
- (unranked): Virus
- Realm: Riboviria
- Kingdom: Orthornavirae
- Phylum: Pisuviricota
- Class: Pisoniviricetes
- Order: Picornavirales
- Family: Picornaviridae
- Subfamily: Caphthovirinae
- Genus: Aphthovirus

= Aphthovirus =

Genus of viruses

Aphthovirus (from the Greek ἄφθα, aphtha, 'vesicles in the mouth') is a viral genus of the family Picornaviridae. Aphthoviruses infect split-hooved animals, and include the causative agent of foot-and-mouth disease, foot-and-mouth disease virus (FMDV). There are seven FMDV serotypes: A, O, C, SAT 1, SAT 2, SAT 3 and Asia 1, and four non-FMDV serotypes belonging to three additional species Bovine rhinitis A virus (BRAV), Bovine rhinitis B virus (BRBV) and Equine rhinitis A virus (ERAV).

== Taxonomy ==
The genus contains the following species, listed by scientific name:

- Aphthovirus bogeli, Bovine rhinitis A virus
- Aphthovirus burrowsi, Equine rhinitis A virus
- Aphthovirus reedi, Bovine rhinitis B virus
- Aphthovirus vesiculae, Foot-and-mouth disease virus

== Structure ==
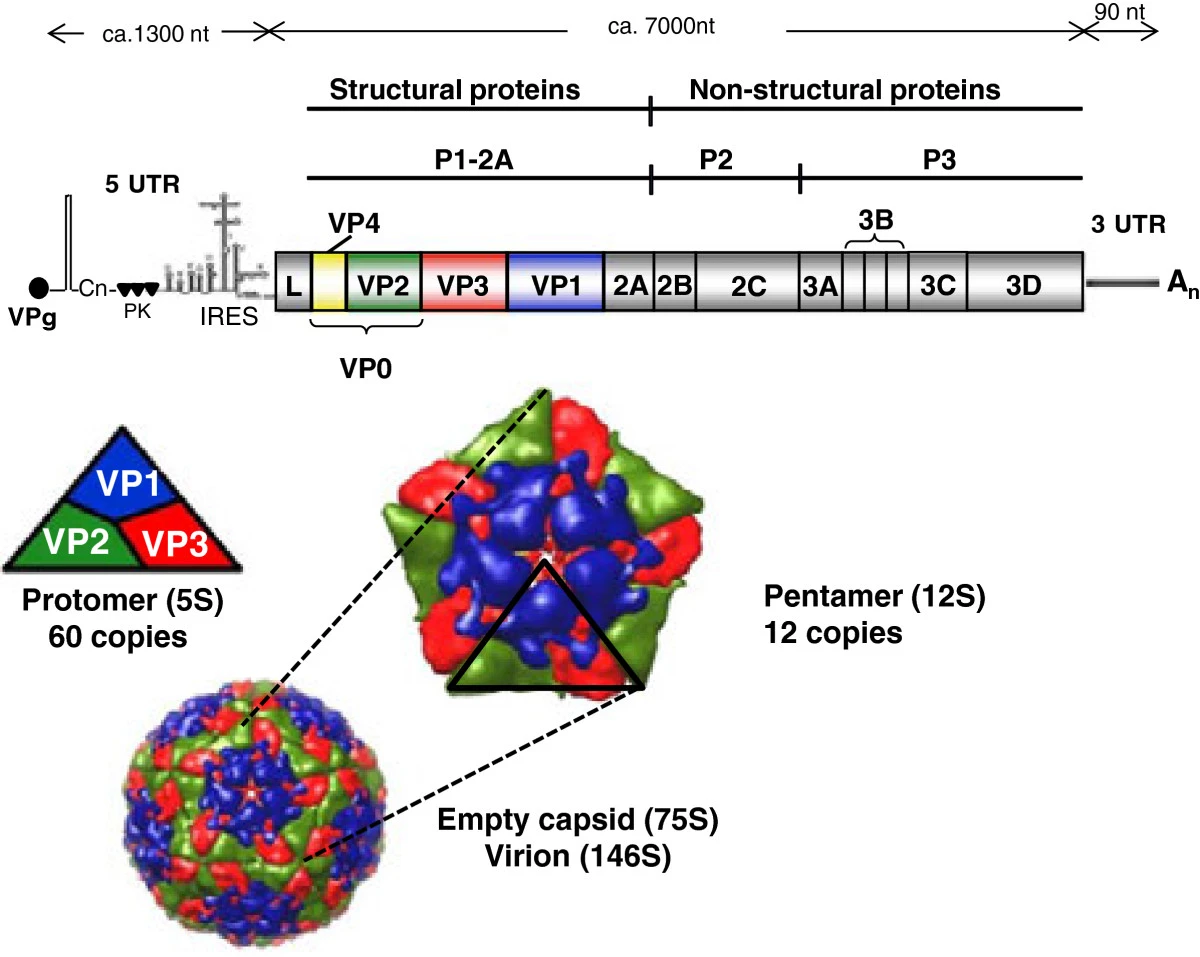
Genome and structure of foot-and-mouth disease virus

Aphthoviruses are non-enveloped and have an icosahedral capsid with a diameter of around 27 to 30 nm. The assembled viral capsid contains a single copy of the RNA genome and 60 copies of the four viral capsid proteins VP1, VP2, VP3, and VP4. The protomers form the sides of the icosahedral capsid. The VP4 protein is internal.

Genus	Structure	Symmetry	Capsid	Genomic arrangement	Genomic segmentation
Aphthovirus	Icosahedral	Pseudo T=3	Non-enveloped	Linear	Monopartite

== Genome ==
The aphthoviruses are differentiated from other picornaviruses as they have a larger genome (7.5–8.5 kilobases). The genome is non-segmented and consists of a positive-sense single-stranded RNA. It contains a single open reading frame with a 5' end linked protein (VPg), which is associated with the genome via a phosphodiester bond linked to a tyrosine residue. The 5' untranslated region (UTR) of the genome contains a poly(C) tract and an internal ribosome entry site (IRES), while the 3' UTR is polyadenylated. The P1 region encodes the structural proteins. The P2 and P3 regions encode the nonstructural proteins associated with replication.

== Replication ==
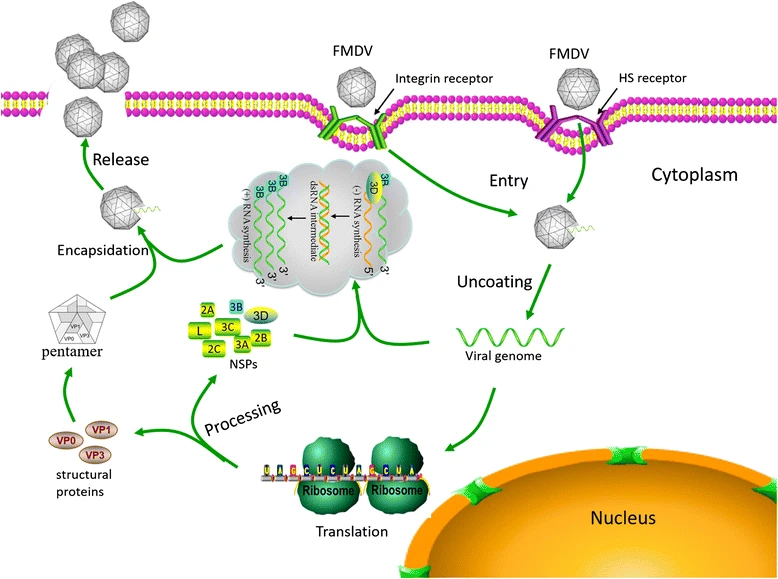
Replication cycle of Foot-and-mouth disease virus

Aphthoviruses replicate in a similar fashion to all picornaviruses. Replication is cytoplasmic and initially involves attachment of the exogenous virus to the cell membrane. Attachment to the membrane and subsequent entry into the cell is mediated by a membrane receptor. After genome replication within the cytoplasm, virion assembly occurs and new virus particles aggregate within the cell. Release of virus particles is mediated by cell lysis.

== Recombination ==
The aphthovirus RNA genome is able to undergo genetic recombination. Recombination occurs at a large number of genomic sites indicating that RNA recombination in aphthovirus is a general, rather than a site specific, phenomenon.

== Pathology and ecology ==
Aphthoviruses include the causative agents of foot-and-mouth disease (FMD), which primarily affects livestock such as cattle, swine, sheep and goats. FMD was first discovered in Italy in the 16th century. Since then, the prevalence of the disease has remained, despite many countries being declared FMD-free. Endemic regions of the disease include areas of Africa, Asia and South America. The virus commonly persists in animal feed and is able to survive environmentally for up to one month. Eradication of FMD in endemic areas has been difficult, despite the availability of a vaccine.

Equine rhinitis A virus (ERAV) was first isolated from horses in the 1960s and 1970s showing acute febrile respiratory disease signs, including fever, cough, clear nasal discharge and lethargy. Given its similarity to the common cold in humans (caused by another picornavirus, rhinovirus), ERAV was initially named "equine rhinovirus 1". Modern molecular biology techniques such as nucleotide sequencing demonstrated that ERAV was in fact more closely related to FMDV, and was reclassified to the genus Aphthovirus.

Genus	Host details	Tissue tropism	Entry details	Release details	Replication site	Assembly site	Transmission
Aphthovirus	Ruminants (i.e. cattle, bison, sheep), pigs, horses.	Epithelium: soft palate; epithelium: pharynx; epithelium: lung; epithelium: feet; epithelium: mouth	Clathrin-mediated endocytosis	Lysis	Cytoplasm	Cytoplasm	Contact; saliva; aerosol

== See also ==
- Animal virology
