= Oscivirus =

Virus classification
- (unranked): Virus
- Realm: Riboviria
- Kingdom: Orthornavirae
- Phylum: Pisuviricota
- Class: Pisoniviricetes
- Order: Picornavirales
- Family: Picornaviridae
- Genus: Oscivirus
- Species: Oscivirus ahokorobi

Genus of viruses

Oscivirus is a genus of viruses in the order Picornavirales, in the family Picornaviridae. Birds serve as natural hosts. There is only one species in this genus: Oscivirus A (Oscivirus ahokorobi).

== Structure ==
Viruses in Oscivirus are non-enveloped, with icosahedral and spherical geometries, and T=pseudo3 symmetry. The diameter is around 30 nm. Genomes are linear and non-segmented, around 7.6kb in length.

Genus	Structure	Symmetry	Capsid	Genomic arrangement	Genomic segmentation
Oscivirus	Icosahedral	Pseudo T=3	Non-enveloped	Linear	Monopartite

== Life cycle ==
Viral replication is cytoplasmic. Entry into the host cell is achieved by attachment of the virus to host receptors, which mediates endocytosis. Replication follows the positive stranded RNA virus replication model. Positive stranded RNA virus transcription is the method of transcription. The virus exits the host cell by lysis, and viroporins. Birds serve as the natural host.

Genus	Host details	Tissue tropism	Entry details	Release details	Replication site	Assembly site	Transmission
Oscivirus	Birds	None	Cell receptor endocytosis	Lysis	Cytoplasm	Cytoplasm	Unknown
