= Cosavirus =

Virus classification
- (unranked): Virus
- Realm: Riboviria
- Kingdom: Orthornavirae
- Phylum: Pisuviricota
- Class: Pisoniviricetes
- Order: Picornavirales
- Family: Picornaviridae
- Genus: Cosavirus

Genus of viruses

Cosavirus is a genus of viruses in the order Picornavirales, in the family Picornaviridae. Human serve as natural hosts. There are 5 species in this genus.

It is unclear whether cosaviruses are connected to gastroenteritis in humans.

== Taxonomy ==
The genus contains the following species, listed by scientific name:

- Cosavirus asiani, Cosavirus A
- Cosavirus bepakis, Cosavirus B
- Cosavirus depakis, Cosavirus D
- Cosavirus eaustrali, Cosavirus E
- Cosavirus fepakis, Cosavirus F

== Structure ==
Viruses in Cosavirus are non-enveloped, with icosahedral, spherical, and round geometries, and T=pseudo3 symmetry. The diameter is around 30 nm. Genomes are linear and non-segmented, around 7-8kb in length.

Genus	Structure	Symmetry	Capsid	Genomic arrangement	Genomic segmentation
Cosavirus	Icosahedral	Pseudo T=3	Non-enveloped	Linear	Monopartite

== Life cycle ==
Viral replication is cytoplasmic. Entry into the host cell is achieved by attachment of the virus to host receptors, which mediates endocytosis. Replication follows the positive stranded RNA virus replication model. Positive stranded RNA virus transcription is the method of transcription. Translation takes place by ribosomal skipping. The virus exits the host cell by lysis, and viroporins. Human serve as the natural host. Transmission routes are fecal-oral.

Genus	Host details	Tissue tropism	Entry details	Release details	Replication site	Assembly site	Transmission
Cosavirus	Human	None	Cell receptor endocytosis	Unknown	Cytoplasm	Cytoplasm	Unknown
