= Avisivirus =

Virus classification
- (unranked): Virus
- Realm: Riboviria
- Kingdom: Orthornavirae
- Phylum: Pisuviricota
- Class: Pisoniviricetes
- Order: Picornavirales
- Family: Picornaviridae
- Subfamily: Paavivirinae
- Genus: Avisivirus

Genus of viruses

Avisivirus is a genus of viruses in the order Picornavirales, in the family Picornaviridae. Turkey and chickens serve as natural hosts. There are three species in this genus.

== Taxonomy ==
The genus contains the following species, listed by scientific name and followed by the exemplar virus of the species:

- Avisivirus aturki; Avisivirus A1
- Avisivirus begallu; Avisivirus B1, also called Chicken picornavirus 2
- Avisivirus cechici; Avisivirus C1, also called Chicken picornavirus 3

== Structure ==
Viruses in Avisivirus are non-enveloped, with icosahedral, spherical, and round geometries, and T=pseudo3 symmetry. The diameter is around 30 nm. Genomes are linear and non-segmented, around 7.5kb in length.

Genus	Structure	Symmetry	Capsid	Genomic arrangement	Genomic segmentation
Avisivirus	Icosahedral	Pseudo T=3	Non-enveloped	Linear	Monopartite

== Life cycle ==
Viral replication is cytoplasmic. Entry into the host cell is achieved by attachment of the virus to host receptors, which mediates endocytosis. Replication follows the positive stranded RNA virus replication model. Positive stranded RNA virus transcription is the method of transcription. Translation takes place by ribosomal skipping. The virus exits the host cell by lysis, and viroporins. Turkey and chickens serve as the natural host.

Genus	Host details	Tissue tropism	Entry details	Release details	Replication site	Assembly site	Transmission
Avisivirus	Turkey, chickens	None	Unknown	Unknown	Cytoplasm	Cytoplasm	Unknown
