= Sapelovirus =

Virus classification
- (unranked): Virus
- Realm: Riboviria
- Kingdom: Orthornavirae
- Phylum: Pisuviricota
- Class: Pisoniviricetes
- Order: Picornavirales
- Family: Picornaviridae
- Subfamily: Ensavirinae
- Genus: Sapelovirus

Genus of viruses

Sapelovirus is a genus of viruses in the order Picornavirales, in the family Picornaviridae. Pigs and simians serve as natural hosts. There are two species in this genus.

== Taxonomy ==
The genus contains the following species:

- Sapelovirus anglia, Porcine sapelovirus
- Sapelovirus besimi, Simian sapelovirus

== Structure ==
Viruses in Sapelovirus are non-enveloped, with icosahedral, spherical, and round geometries, and T=pseudo3 symmetry. The diameter is around 30 nm. Genomes are linear and non-segmented, around 7.5-8.3kb in length.

Genus	Structure	Symmetry	Capsid	Genomic arrangement	Genomic segmentation
Sapelovirus	Icosahedral	Pseudo T=3	Non-enveloped	Linear	Monopartite

== Life cycle ==
Viral replication is cytoplasmic. Entry into the host cell is achieved by attachment of the virus to host receptors, which mediates endocytosis. Replication follows the positive stranded RNA virus replication model. Positive stranded RNA virus transcription is the method of transcription. The virus exits the host cell by lysis, and viroporins. Pigs and simians serve as natural hosts.

Genus	Host details	Tissue tropism	Entry details	Release details	Replication site	Assembly site	Transmission
Sapelovirus	Birds	None	Cell receptor endocytosis	Lysis	Cytoplasm	Cytoplasm	Unknown
