= Megrivirus =

Virus classification
- (unranked): Virus
- Realm: Riboviria
- Kingdom: Orthornavirae
- Phylum: Pisuviricota
- Class: Pisoniviricetes
- Order: Picornavirales
- Family: Picornaviridae
- Genus: Megrivirus

Genus of viruses

Megrivirus is a genus of viruses in the order Picornavirales, in the family Picornaviridae. Birds serve as natural hosts. There are five species in this genus. Diseases associated with this genus include: hepatitis.

== Taxonomy ==
The genus contains the following species, listed by scientific name and followed by the exemplar virus of the species:

- Megrivirus aturhepa; Megrivirus A2, also called Duck megrivirus
- Megrivirus berockdo; Megrivirus B1, also called Pigeon mesivirus 1
- Megrivirus chigalli; Megrivirus C1, also called Chicken megrivirus
- Megrivirus deharri; Megrivirus D1, also called Harrier megrivirus
- Megrivirus epengu; Megrivirus E1, also called Penguin megrivirus

== Structure ==
Viruses in Megrivirus are non-enveloped, with icosahedral and spherical geometries, and T=pseudo3 symmetry. The diameter is around 30 nm. Genomes are linear and non-segmented, around 9kb in length.

Genus	Structure	Symmetry	Capsid	Genomic arrangement	Genomic segmentation
Megrivirus	Icosahedral	Pseudo T=3	Non-enveloped	Linear	Monopartite

== Life cycle ==
Viral replication is cytoplasmic. Entry into the host cell is achieved by attachment of the virus to host receptors, which mediates endocytosis. Replication follows the positive stranded RNA virus replication model. Positive stranded RNA virus transcription is the method of transcription. The virus exits the host cell by lysis, and viroporins. Birds serve as the natural host.

Genus	Host details	Tissue tropism	Entry details	Release details	Replication site	Assembly site	Transmission
Megrivirus	Unknown	None	Cell receptor endocytosis	Lysis	Cytoplasm	Cytoplasm	Unknown
