= Gallivirus =

Virus classification
- (unranked): Virus
- Realm: Riboviria
- Kingdom: Orthornavirae
- Phylum: Pisuviricota
- Class: Pisoniviricetes
- Order: Picornavirales
- Family: Picornaviridae
- Genus: Gallivirus
- Species: Gallivirus afowli

Genus of viruses

Gallivirus is a genus of viruses in the order Picornavirales, in the family Picornaviridae.

== Host and specie ==
Turkey and chicken serve as natural hosts. There is only one species in this genus: Gallivirus A (Gallivirus afowli).

== Structure ==
Viruses in Gallivirus are non-enveloped, with icosahedral and spherical geometries, and T=pseudo3 symmetry. The diameter is around 30 nm. Genomes are linear and non-segmented, around 8.5kb in length.

Genus	Structure	Symmetry	Capsid	Genomic arrangement	Genomic segmentation
Gallivirus	Icosahedral	Pseudo T=3	Non-enveloped	Linear	Monopartite

== Life cycle ==
Viral replication is cytoplasmic. Entry into the host cell is achieved by attachment of the virus to host receptors, which mediates endocytosis. Replication follows the positive stranded RNA virus replication model. Positive stranded RNA virus transcription is the method of transcription. The virus exits the host cell by lysis, and viroporins. Turkey and chicken serve as the natural host.

Genus	Host details	Tissue tropism	Entry details	Release details	Replication site	Assembly site	Transmission
Gallivirus	Turkey, chicken	None	Cell receptor endocytosis	Lysis	Cytoplasm	Cytoplasm	Unknown
