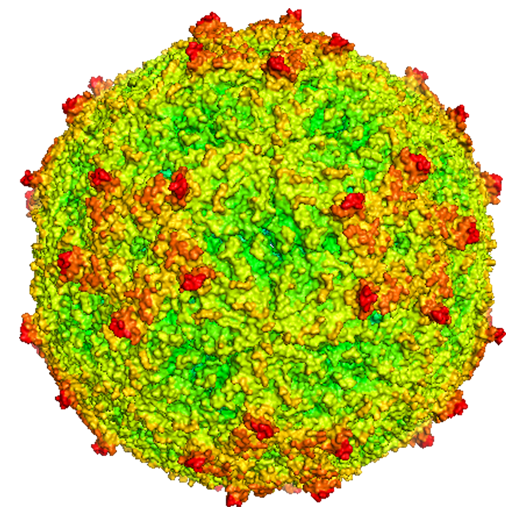
- Surface depiction of Mengovirus (2MEV) coloured by radial height to illuminate surface features

Virus classification
- (unranked): Virus
- Realm: Riboviria
- Kingdom: Orthornavirae
- Phylum: Pisuviricota
- Class: Pisoniviricetes
- Order: Picornavirales
- Family: Picornaviridae
- Genus: Cardiovirus
- Species: Cardiovirus A
- Virus: Mengovirus

= Mengovirus =

Species of virus

Mengovirus, also known as Columbia SK virus, mouse Elberfield virus, and Encephalomyocarditis virus (EMCV), belongs to the genus Cardiovirus which is a member of the Picornaviridae. Its genome is a single stranded positive-sense RNA molecule, making the Mengoviruses a class IV virus under the Baltimore classification system. The genome is approximately 8400nt in length, and has 5’ VG protein (Virus genome protein) and a 3’ polyadenine tail. Mengovirus was isolated by George W. A. Dick in 1948, in the Mengo district of Entebbe in Uganda, from a captive rhesus monkey that had developed hind limb paralysis.

== Structure ==
Mengovirus is a non-enveloped virus which has an icosahedral capsid. The virion is 30 nm in diameter and displays icosahedral symmetry.

== Gene expression and genome replication ==
Once inside a host cell, the Mengovirus genome acts as a piece of mRNA and is directly translated by the host ribosomes in the cytoplasm. There is a large un-translated region at the 5’ end of the RNA that has a ribosome binding site, removing the need of a cap. A single polypeptide is made and is cleaved into individual proteins by viral proteases. The genome is divided into three parts: P1, P2, and P3. P1 encodes the virus capsid proteins, P2 and P3 encode genes required for genome replication to occur. For replication to occur an intermediate double-stranded RNA molecule is made to be used as a template for the production of positive sense genomes.

== Infection ==
Mengovirus is infectious to vertebrate animals, and has been isolated from mice and other rodents. It can also cause acute fever in humans. There is no specific treatment for a Mengovirus infection; although dipyridamole has been shown to inhibit its replication. The Mengovirus is able to suppress the host's immune response by reducing the expression of Nuclear Factor kappa B using the leader protein.
