= Dicipivirus =

Virus classification
- (unranked): Virus
- Realm: Riboviria
- Kingdom: Orthornavirae
- Phylum: Pisuviricota
- Class: Pisoniviricetes
- Order: Picornavirales
- Family: Picornaviridae
- Genus: Dicipivirus

Genus of viruses

Dicipivirus is a genus of viruses in the order Picornavirales, in the family Picornaviridae. Dogs and hedgehogs serve as natural hosts. There are two species in this genus.

== Taxonomy ==
The genus contains the following species, listed by scientific name and followed by the exemplar virus of the species:

- Dicipivirus acadici; Cadicivirus A1, also called Canine picodicistrovirus
- Dicipivirus berinro; Cadicivirus B1, also called Hedgehog dicipivirus

== Structure ==
Viruses in Dicipivirus are non-enveloped, with icosahedral, spherical, and round geometries, and T=pseudo3 symmetry. The diameter is around 30 nm. Genomes are linear and non-segmented, around 8.8kb in length. The genome has 2 open reading frames.

Genus	Structure	Symmetry	Capsid	Genomic arrangement	Genomic segmentation
Dicipivirus	Icosahedral	Pseudo T=3	Non-enveloped	Linear	Monopartite

== Life cycle ==
Viral replication is cytoplasmic. Entry into the host cell is achieved by attachment of the virus to host receptors, which mediates endocytosis. Replication follows the positive stranded RNA virus replication model. Positive stranded RNA virus transcription is the method of transcription. The virus exits the host cell by lysis, and viroporins. Dogs and hedgehogs serve as the natural host.

Genus	Host details	Tissue tropism	Entry details	Release details	Replication site	Assembly site	Transmission
Dicipivirus	Dog	None	Cell receptor endocytosis	Unknown	Cytoplasm	Cytoplasm	Unknown
