= Aquamavirus =

Virus classification
- (unranked): Virus
- Realm: Riboviria
- Kingdom: Orthornavirae
- Phylum: Pisuviricota
- Class: Pisoniviricetes
- Order: Picornavirales
- Family: Picornaviridae
- Genus: Aquamavirus
- Species: Aquamavirus apinni

Genus of viruses

Aquamavirus is a genus of viruses in the order Picornavirales, in the family Picornaviridae. Seals and bears serve as natural hosts. Only one species is in this genus: Aquamavirus A (Aquamavirus apinni).

== Structure ==
Viruses in Aquamavirus are nonenveloped, with icosahedral, spherical, and round geometries, and T=pseudo3 symmetry. The diameter is around 30 nm. Genomes are linear and nonsegmented, around 6.7 kb in length.

== Lifecycle ==
Viral replication is cytoplasmic. Entry into the host cell is achieved by attachment of the virus to host receptors, which mediates endocytosis. Replication follows the positive-stranded RNA virus replication model. Positive-stranded RNA virus transcription is the method of transcription. The virus exits the host cell by lysis, and viroporins. Seals and bears serve as the natural hosts.
