= Rosavirus =

Virus classification
- (unranked): Virus
- Realm: Riboviria
- Kingdom: Orthornavirae
- Phylum: Pisuviricota
- Class: Pisoniviricetes
- Order: Picornavirales
- Family: Picornaviridae
- Genus: Rosavirus

Genus of viruses

Rosavirus is a genus of viruses in the order Picornavirales, in the family Picornaviridae. Human and rodents serve as natural hosts. There are three species in this genus.

== Taxonomy ==
The genus contains the following species:

- Rosavirus acaliforni; Rosavirus A1
- Rosavirus brorati; Rosavirus B1, also called Norway rat rosavirus
- Rosavirus chewhibe; Rosavirus C1, also called Rat rosavirus

== Structure ==
Viruses in Rosavirus are non-enveloped, with icosahedral, spherical, and round geometries, and T=pseudo3 symmetry. The diameter is around 30 nm. Genomes are linear and non-segmented, around 9kb in length.

Genus	Structure	Symmetry	Capsid	Genomic arrangement	Genomic segmentation
Rosavirus	Icosahedral	Pseudo T=3	Non-enveloped	Linear	Monopartite

== Life cycle ==
Viral replication is cytoplasmic. Entry into the host cell is achieved by attachment of the virus to host receptors, which mediates endocytosis. Replication follows the positive stranded RNA virus replication model. Positive stranded RNA virus transcription is the method of transcription. The virus exits the host cell by lysis, and viroporins. Human and rodents serve as the natural host.

Genus	Host details	Tissue tropism	Entry details	Release details	Replication site	Assembly site	Transmission
Rosavirus	Human, rodents	None	Cell receptor endocytosis	Lysis	Cytoplasm	Cytoplasm	Unknown
