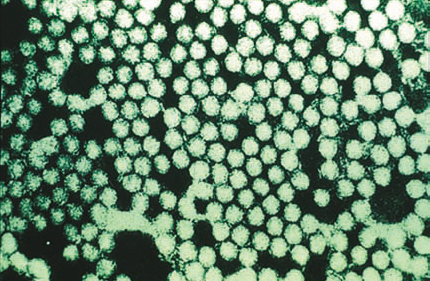
- Electronmicrograph of Foot-and-mouth disease virus

Virus classification
- (unranked): Virus
- Realm: Riboviria
- Kingdom: Orthornavirae
- Phylum: Pisuviricota
- Class: Pisoniviricetes
- Order: Picornavirales
- Family: Picornaviridae
- Genus: Aphthovirus
- Species: Aphthovirus vesiculae

= Foot-and-mouth disease virus =

Species of virus

Foot-and-mouth disease virus (FMDV) is a virus in the genus Aphthovirus that causes foot-and-mouth disease in cattle. As a member of the family Picornaviridae, FMDV is a positive-sense, single-stranded RNA virus. Like other members of the picornavirus family, FMDV is small and unenveloped, with an icosahedral capsid.

The virus causes foot-and-mouth disease, a highly contagious disease affecting cattle, pigs, sheep, goats, and other cloven-hoofed animals. Foot-and-mouth disease causes fever and the formation of vesicles (blisters) in infected animals, which form in the mouth and on the feet and teats. While the disease is usually nonfatal to adult livestock, survivors are left in a weakened state which impacts both meat and milk production, making outbreaks very costly and disruptive to agricultural production overall.

== Structure and genome ==
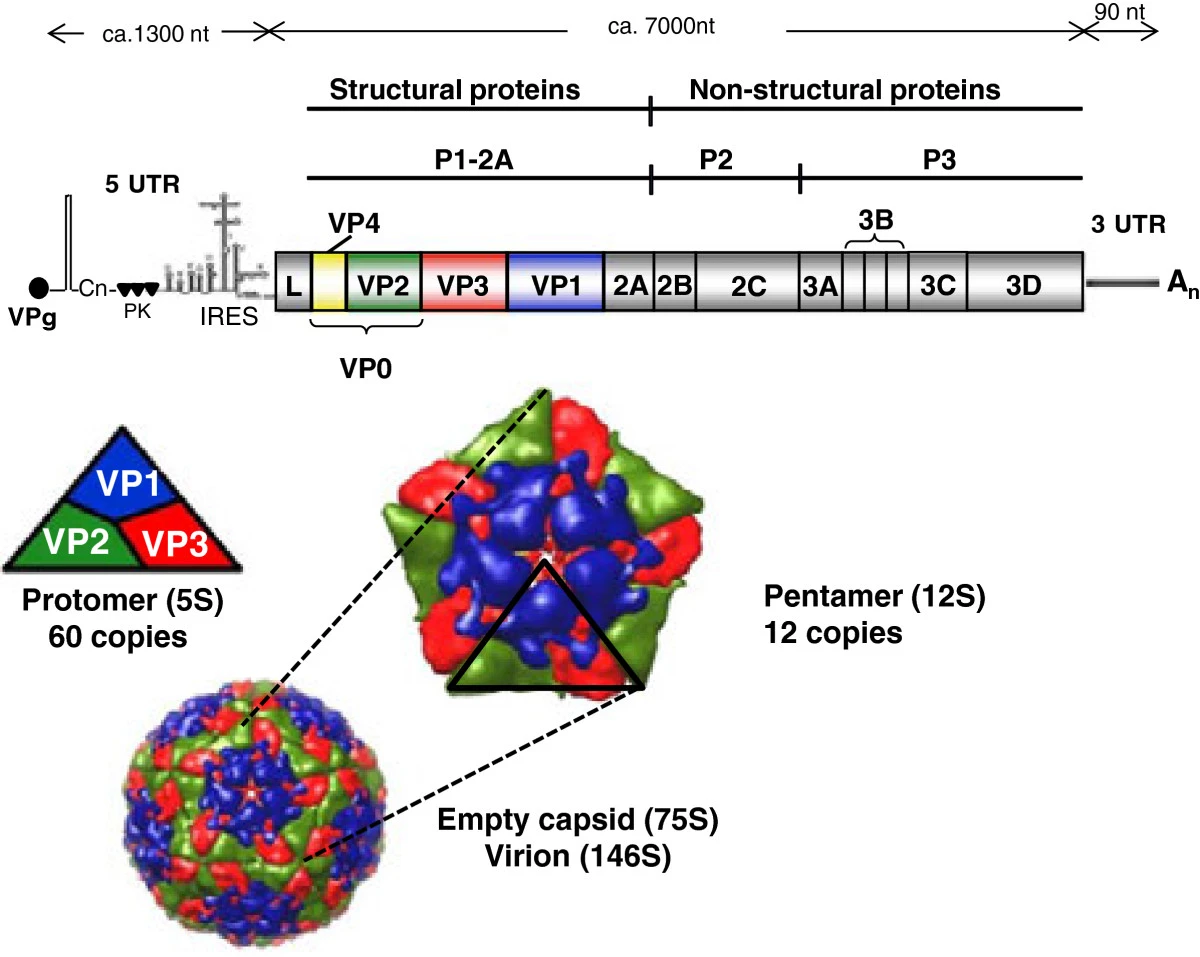
Genome organization and structure of foot-and-mouth disease virus

The virus particle (25-30 nm) has an icosahedral capsid made of protein, without envelope, containing a positive-sense (mRNA sense) single-stranded ribonucleic acid (RNA) genome.

== Replication ==
When the virus comes in contact with the membrane of a host cell, it binds to a receptor site and triggers a folding-in of the membrane. Once the virus is inside the host cell, the capsid dissolves, and the RNA gets replicated, and translated into viral proteins by the cell's ribosomes using a cap-independent mechanism driven by the internal ribosome entry site element.

The synthesis of viral proteins include 2A 'ribosomal skip' during translation, which separates the capsid polyprotein from the late proteins. They include proteases that inhibit the synthesis of normal cell proteins, and other proteins that interact with different components of the host cell. The infected cell ends up producing large quantities of viral RNA and capsid proteins, which are assembled to form new viruses. After assembly, the host cell lyses (bursts) and releases the new viruses.

=== Recombination ===
Recombination can occur within host cells during co-infections by different FMDV strains. Recombination is common and a key feature of FMDV evolution.

== Serotypes ==
Foot-and-mouth disease virus occurs in seven major serotypes: O, A, C, SAT-1, SAT-2, SAT-3, and Asia-1. These serotypes show some regionality, and the O serotype is most common.

== See also ==
- Animal viruses
