= Picornain 3C =

Class of enzymes

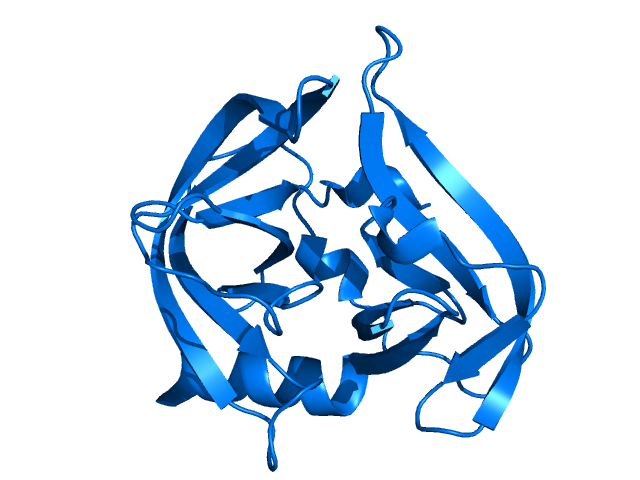
- Ribbon diagram of picornain, PDB entry 5fx6

Identifiers
- EC no.: 3.4.22.28
- CAS no.: 97162-88-4

Databases
- IntEnz: IntEnz view
- BRENDA: BRENDA entry
- ExPASy: NiceZyme view
- KEGG: KEGG entry
- MetaCyc: metabolic pathway
- PRIAM: profile
- PDB structures: RCSB PDB PDBe PDBsum
Search
- PMC: articles
- PubMed: articles
- NCBI: proteins

Picornain 3C (EC 3.4.22.28) is a protease found in picornaviruses, which cleaves peptide bonds of non-terminal sequences. Picornain 3C’s endopeptidase activity is primarily responsible for the catalytic process of selectively cleaving Gln-Gly bonds in the polyprotein of poliovirus and with substitution of Glu for Gln, and Ser or Thr for Gly in other picornaviruses. Picornain 3C are cysteine proteases related by amino acid sequence to trypsin-like serine proteases. Picornain 3C is encoded by enteroviruses, rhinoviruses, aphtoviruses and cardioviruses. These genera of picoviruses cause a wide range of infections in humans and mammals.

Picornavirus belongs to the family Picornaviridae. Picornavirus virions are nonenveloped and the +ssRNA nonsegmented genome is encapsulated in an icosahedral protein structure made from four capsid proteins encoded by the virus. Picornavirus viral replication typically takes place in the cytoplasm of the cell. Picornavirus +ssRNA genome then gets translated via internal ribosome entry sites (IRES) that is recognized by host cell ribosomes for cap independent translation. To compete with other mRNA transcripts, picornavirus destroys cap dependent translation in the host so host cell ribosomes will favor translation of viral transcripts. +ssRNA makes –ssRNA intermediates to make more viral +ssRNA. The genome of picornavirus is exhibited in Figure 1. As displayed, picornavirus does not have a viral 5’ cap but instead encodes for a protein Vpg. The absence of the 5’ cap is why the picornavirus genome depends on cap dependent translation for replication. The genome, however, does contain a poly-A tail on the opposite end of the Vpg protein. Both ends of the genome has UTR (untranslated regions). The picornavirus genome has three proteins (P1, P2, P3). P1 encodes for a proteins (VP1, VP2, VP3, and VP4) that make the capsid proteins. P2 and P3 proteins assist in infectivity of the picornavirus to hijack and interfere with host cell functionality. Specifically, 2B, 2C, and 3A proteins interfere with host cell function and the 3D protein encodes as the RNA polymerase. 2A and 3C act as proteinases and their function varies among the different genera of picornavirus.

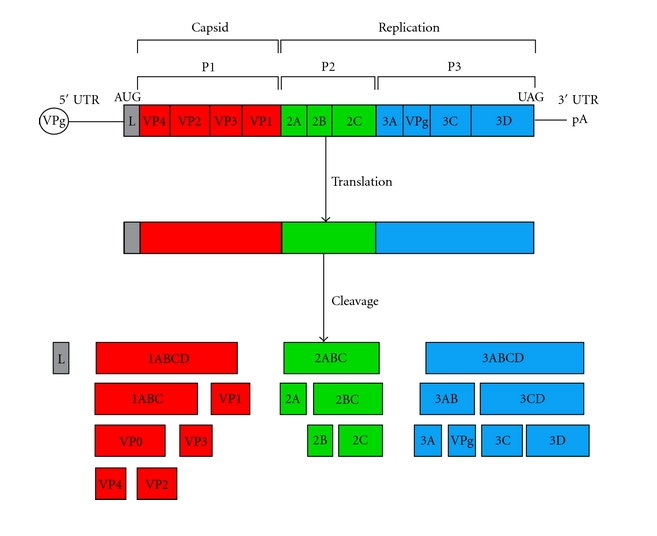
Figure 1- Picornavirus genome

Genus	Members	3C protease activity	3C protease target
Enterovirus	Poliovirus	Intereferes with TATA binding protein and interferes with cap dependent translation factor	Pyrazoles 17 and 18
	Coxsackievirus	Activates caspase activity and interferes with cap dependent translation	Pyrazoles 17 and 18
	Rhinovirus	Cleaves OCT-1 transcription and interferes with cap dependent translation factor	Rupintrivir AG7088, Pyrazoles 17 and 18
Apthovirus	Foot-and-mouth disease virus	Fragmentation of golgi apparatus and inhibition of microtubule regrowth (MTOC), interferes with cap dependent translation factor	α, β-unsaturated carbonyl groups combined with peptidyl-binding elements
Hepatovirus	Hepatitis A	Cleavage of NEMO (NF-κB)	hexadeoxyribonucleotides

Poliovirus is a member of the family Picornaviridae. Poliovirus is transmitted through the oral-fecal route and does not always cause symptoms. A small amount of poliovirus infections cause paralysis when the virus infects the nervous system. Poliovirus infects host cells through inhibition of transcription machinery and function. Polioviruses’ protease 3C is responsible for host cell transcription shut off by cleaving the TATA-binding protein and other transcription factors at glutamine-glycine sites This inhibition of transcription is caused by Protease 3C, one of Polioviruses’ 4 viral proteins encoded in its genome. Poliovirus 3C protease replication occurs in the cytoplasm, yet is able to inhibit transcription in the nucleus without any nuclear localization. Therefore, protease 3C depends on poliovirus 3CD protein for the translocation of 3C protease to carry out transcription inhibition in the nucleus. The 3CD polyprotein of poliovirus consists of the precursor of both the 3C protease (3Cpro) and the 3D RNA polymerase. 3CD undergoes proteolysis, which leads to localization in the nucleus. “The 3C protein, being of unknown function, is a product of 3CD cleavage by 2Apro”. Poliovirus is also involved in the cleavage of eIF4E (Eukaryotic translation initiation factor 4E). eIF4E is a protein involved in directing Eukaryotic ribosomes in cap dependent translation. The proteolytic cleavage of eIF4E disables the host from carrying out cap dependent translation.

Coxsackievirus belongs to the Picornaviridae family and Enterovirus genus. Coxsackievirus is shed through stool and bodily fluids and is prevalent in children but can infection occur in adults. Symptoms for coxsackievirus are fever, malaise, rash and blisters. Coxsackievirus primarily infects mucosal and epithelial membranes. 3C proteinase activity in coxsackievirus causes apoptosis in host cells. Both 2A(pro) and 3C(pro) induce caspase-8-mediated by activation of caspase-3. Caspase stands for cysteine-aspartic acid protease and play an essential role in the apoptotic pathway of the cell. Protease 2A and 3C also induce apoptosis via intrinsic mitochondria mediated apoptosis, which leads to the release of cytochrome C from mitochondria and activating caspase- 9 (Chau). 3C is responsible for the actions via the up-regulation of Bax and cleavage of Bid. Protease 3C and 2A are also responsible for the cleavage of translation initiation eIF4GE and poly-A- binding protein, PABP. This disruption of this binding domain results in down regulation of the initiation of cap dependent translation. Also, 3C and 2A are responsible for down-regulation of cyclic AMP responsive element binding protein (CREB), a cellular transcription factor. CREB decreases or increases transcription of certain genes and therefore, the inhibition of CREB causes the host cell’s to lose ability of this ability to regulate transcription.

Rhinovirus is principal cause for the common cold. Rhinovirus, also member of picornavirus, and can be transmitted through respiratory droplets or indirectly. Rhinovirus infects the upper respiratory tract to cause common cold symptoms. Rhinovirus uses protease 3C and 3D to induce cytopathetic effects in the host cell. 3C and 3D act similarly in rhinovirus as they do in poliovirus because they are both involved in early viral infection of the host cell via host cell transcription inhibition by 3C proteolytic activity. 3C and 3CD of Rhinoviruses specifically target OCT-1 transcription factor for proteolytic cleavage. This proteolytic cleavage of the OCT-1 causes the inhibition of further cellular transcription. Similar to poliovirus and coxsackievirus, Rhinovirus protease 3C is also responsible for cleaving eIF4E (Eukaryotic translation initiation factor 4E), which disables cap dependent translation in the host cell.

Foot and mouth disease virus (FMDV) is a part of the aphthovirus genera. Foot and mouth disease virus primarily is found in cloven-hoofed animals such as pigs and cows and causes severe fever for the first couple of days and then blisters in the foot and mouth of the animal. FMDV does not cross over or infect humans but is extremely infectious within cloven-hoofed animals. Foot and mouth disease 3C protease activity is responsible for the fragmentation of golgi apparatus and inhibition of microtubule regrowth. 3C protease activity is responsible for the loss of tethering of microtubules to the microtubule organizing center (MTOC) region. Both of proteolytic effects on the host cell inhibit the transport of cellular proteins to the plasma membrane. This destruction of the secretory pathway reduces expression of major histocompatibility antigens at plasma membrane therefore slowing secretion of proinflammatory cytokines.

Hepatitis A 3C proteinase is a member of the cysteine proteases that are responsible for the infectivity and maturation of HAV. Hepatitis A 3C protease cleaves NEMO at the Q304 residue; NEMO is a NF-κB essential modulator responsible for activation of interferon (IFN) antiviral response. Cys24Ser (C24S) is a homolog of Hepatitis 3C proteinase, is responsible for inactivating Cys172 through alkylation of the sulfur at its active site. The sulfur alkylation of Cys172 causes inactivity while the N-alkylation of His102 causes a significant rise in enzymatic activity. Modification of enzymatic activity can be controlled by solution or crystallized N-iodoacetyl-valine-phenylalanine-amide (IVF). Therefore, IVF controls proteolytic inhibition through interactions with active site of enzyme.

== Picornavirus 3C protease targeting ==
Picornavirus 3C protease’s infectivity and proteolytic effects is what leads picornavirus to cause pathogenicity in humans and other mammals. For most of these viruses, 3C is necessary for cytopathetic effects on the host cell. So far, 3C protease inhibitors have been discovered and used to monitor effects of picornavirus. Much testing will hopefully find an effective antiviral therapy targeting 3C protease. Targeting and inhibiting 3C protease activity will hopefully reduce the infectivity of the host cell. For poliovirus, Bis-vinylic organotellurane targets 3C inhibition, which is used as antiviral therapy. Currently no anti-picornal drug targeting 3C protease is in the market yet, but inhibitors such as rupintrivir and pyrazoles show promising targeting in broad range of picornaviruses.
