= Avihepatovirus =

Virus classification
- (unranked): Virus
- Realm: Riboviria
- Kingdom: Orthornavirae
- Phylum: Pisuviricota
- Class: Pisoniviricetes
- Order: Picornavirales
- Family: Picornaviridae
- Genus: Avihepatovirus
- Species: Avihepatovirus ahepati

Genus of viruses

Avihepatovirus is a genus of viruses in the order Picornavirales, in the family Picornaviridae. Ducks and geese serve as natural hosts. There is only one species in this genus: Avihepatovirus A, also called Duck hepatitis A virus (Avihepatovirus ahepati). Diseases associated with this genus include: fatal hepatitis.

== Structure ==
Viruses in Avihepatovirus are non-enveloped, with icosahedral, spherical, and round geometries, and T=pseudo3 symmetry. The diameter is around 30 nm. Genomes are linear and non-segmented, around 7.7kb in length.

Genus	Structure	Symmetry	Capsid	Genomic arrangement	Genomic segmentation
Avihepatovirus	Icosahedral	Pseudo T=3	Non-enveloped	Linear	Monopartite

== Life cycle ==
Viral replication is cytoplasmic. Entry into the host cell is achieved by attachment of the virus to host receptors, which mediates endocytosis. Replication follows the positive stranded RNA virus replication model. Positive stranded RNA virus transcription is the method of transcription. Translation takes place by ribosomal skipping. The virus exits the host cell by lysis, and viroporins. Ducks and geese serve as the natural host. Transmission routes are fecal-oral.

Genus	Host details	Tissue tropism	Entry details	Release details	Replication site	Assembly site	Transmission
Avihepatovirus	Birds	None	Unknown	Unknown	Cytoplasm	Cytoplasm	Unknown

== See also ==
- Turkey viral hepatitis
