= Imocitrelvir =

Clinical data
- Other names: AG-7404, V-7404

Identifiers
- IUPAC name: ethyl (E,4S)-4-[[(2S)-2-[3-[(5-methyl-1,2-oxazole-3-carbonyl)amino]-2-oxopyridin-1-yl]pent-4-ynoyl]amino]-5-[(3S)-2-oxopyrrolidin-3-yl]pent-2-enoate
- CAS Number: 343565-99-1
- PubChem CID: 5280053
- IUPHAR/BPS: 13223
- ChemSpider: 4443793
- UNII: VQ1AN3OO42
- ChEMBL: ChEMBL141157

Chemical and physical data
- Formula: C_{26}H_{29}N_{5}O_{7}
- Molar mass: 523.546 g·mol^{−1}
- 3D model (JSmol): Interactive image
- SMILES: CCOC(=O)/C=C/[C@H](C[C@@H]1CCNC1=O)NC(=O)[C@H](CC#C)N2C=CC=C(C2=O)NC(=O)C3=NOC(=C3)C
- InChI: InChI=InChI=1S/C26H29N5O7/c1-4-7-21(31-13-6-8-19(26(31)36)29-24(34)20-14-16(3)38-30-20)25(35)28-18(9-10-22(32)37-5-2)15-17-11-12-27-23(17)33/h1,6,8-10,13-14,17-18,21H,5,7,11-12,15H2,2-3H3,(H,27,33)(H,28,35)(H,29,34)/b10-9+/t17-,18+,21-/m0/s1; Key:QCUZOJBYWQPLIN-BNMFZAHFSA-N

Imocitrelvir is an investigational new drug that is being evaluated for the treatment of viral infections. It is a 3C protease inhibitor in picornaviruses. Originally developed by Pfizer for treating human rhinovirus infections, this small molecule has shown promise against a broader range of viruses, including polioviruses.
