= Leritrelvir =

Legal status
- Legal status: Rx in China

Identifiers
- IUPAC name: (3S,3aS,6aR)-2-[(2S)-2-cyclohexyl-2-[(2,2,2-trifluoroacetyl)amino]acetyl]-N-[(2S)-4-(cyclopentylamino)-3,4-dioxo-1-[(3S)-2-oxopyrrolidin-3-yl]butan-2-yl]-3,3a,4,5,6,6a-hexahydro-1H-cyclopenta[c]pyrrole-3-carboxamide
- CAS Number: 2923310-64-7
- PubChem CID: 167713195
- ChemSpider: 128922060
- ChEMBL: ChEMBL5422898

Chemical and physical data
- Formula: C_{31}H_{44}F_{3}N_{5}O_{6}
- Molar mass: 639.717 g·mol^{−1}
- 3D model (JSmol): Interactive image
- SMILES: C1CCC(CC1)[C@@H](C(=O)N2C[C@@H]3CCC[C@@H]3[C@H]2C(=O)N[C@@H](C[C@@H]4CCNC4=O)C(=O)C(=O)NC5CCCC5)NC(=O)C(F)(F)F
- InChI: InChI=1S/C31H44F3N5O6/c32-31(33,34)30(45)38-23(17-7-2-1-3-8-17)29(44)39-16-19-9-6-12-21(19)24(39)27(42)37-22(15-18-13-14-35-26(18)41)25(40)28(43)36-20-10-4-5-11-20/h17-24H,1-16H2,(H,35,41)(H,36,43)(H,37,42)(H,38,45)/t18-,19-,21-,22-,23-,24-/m0/s1; Key:ICGMMLTUQDVAST-HEZDJTGRSA-N

Leritrelvir (RAY1216) is an antiviral drug which acts as a 3C-like protease inhibitor. It was developed and approved in China for treatment of COVID-19.
