= 2019 United States hepatitis A outbreak =

Disease outbreak in the United States

- Pathogen: Hepatitis A virus
- Location: Multiple U.S. states and cities, including Kentucky, Ohio, Mississippi, and Florida, and the city of Philadelphia
- First reported: October 6, 2015
- Date: 2015–2023
- Confirmed cases: 26,000+
- Deaths: 268

The 2019 United States hepatitis A outbreak was an occurrence of several declared outbreaks of the disease, hepatitis A, peaking in locations in the United States including substantial instances in the states of Kentucky, Mississippi, Florida, and the city of Philadelphia, as well as an isolated food-related occurrence in New Jersey. The hepatitis A outbreaks have been reported as early as 2016. As of October 2019, over 26,000 cases and 268 deaths were reported, with the largest number occurring in Kentucky, with over 4,000 cases.

== History ==
The U.S. Centers for Disease Control and Prevention identified the outbreak as a continuation of a rise in hepatitis A cases beginning in 2016. According to the CDC:

Since the hepatitis A vaccine was first recommended in 1996, rates of hepatitis A have declined dramatically in the United States. In 2015, there were only 1,390 reported cases of hepatitis A in the nation. However, since the current outbreaks were first identified in late 2016, there have been more than 22,000 cases reported, mostly among groups most at-risk. Severe complications, high rates of hospitalization, and at least 200 deaths have occurred nationwide as a result of these outbreaks.

The outbreak has been worst in areas with high incidence of drug use, poor sanitation, and homelessness. Countermeasures to the outbreak have included vaccination campaigns at both state and federal levels.

== Responses ==
On August 1, 2019, the Philadelphia Department of Health declared the hepatitis A outbreak a public health emergency, advising persons at risk to be vaccinated, and offering free vaccinations for those in contact with infected persons.

Florida Lieutenant Governor Jeanette Núñez tweeted, "We urge vaccination and stress the importance of washing your hands regularly".

In New Jersey, it was announced in August 2019 that a food handler employed at the Mendham Golf and Tennis Club, in Mendham, New Jersey, had become infected with hepatitis A, and was deemed likely to be responsible for 27 other people becoming ill with the disease, one of whom died.
