= Ratutrelvir =

Clinical data
- Other names: 83-0060, TRX01

Identifiers
- IUPAC name: (1R,2S,5S)-N-[(1S)-1-cyano-2-(2-oxo-1,3-dihydroindol-3-yl)ethyl]-3-[(2S)-3,3-dimethyl-2-[(2,2,2-trifluoroacetyl)amino]butanoyl]-6,6-dimethyl-3-azabicyclo[3.1.0]hexane-2-carboxamide
- CAS Number: 2929236-94-0
- PubChem CID: 169861725
- IUPHAR/BPS: 13737
- UNII: VR2S5588W2

Chemical and physical data
- Formula: C_{27}H_{32}F_{3}N_{5}O_{4}
- Molar mass: 547.579 g·mol^{−1}
- 3D model (JSmol): Interactive image
- SMILES: CC1([C@@H]2[C@H]1[C@H](N(C2)C(=O)[C@H](C(C)(C)C)NC(=O)C(F)(F)F)C(=O)N[C@@H](CC3C4=CC=CC=C4NC3=O)C#N)C
- InChI: InChI=InChI=1S/C27H32F3N5O4/c1-25(2,3)20(34-24(39)27(28,29)30)23(38)35-12-16-18(26(16,4)5)19(35)22(37)32-13(11-31)10-15-14-8-6-7-9-17(14)33-21(15)36/h6-9,13,15-16,18-20H,10,12H2,1-5H3,(H,32,37)(H,33,36)(H,34,39)/t13-,15?,16-,18-,19-,20+/m0/s1; Key:VVIHXCHAXVESGZ-MXEWLHNESA-N

Ratutrelvir is an investigational new drug that is being evaluated by Traws Pharma for the treatment of COVID-19 infections. It is a 3C-like protease inhibitor.

== Clinical trials ==
A phase 2 clinical trial of Ratutrelvir was completed in November 2026 and the company said it was would seek regulatory approval for sale. A preliminary analysis of results from the trial were released in July.
