= VPg =

Viral protein

VPg (viral protein genome-linked) is a protein that is covalently attached to the 5′ end of positive strand viral RNA and acts as a primer during RNA synthesis in a variety of virus families including Picornaviridae, Potyviridae, Astroviridae and Caliciviridae. There are some studies showing that a possible VPg protein is also present in astroviridae, however, experimental evidence for this has not yet been provided and requires further study. The primer activity of VPg occurs when nucleotides are covalently added to it, providing nucleobases that can base pair with the 3' end of the viral RNA. For some virus families, VPg also has a role in translation initiation by acting like a 5' mRNA cap.

VPg was first described in initial investigations of poliovirus RNA as a protein covalently attached to the 5' end of the genome. and later seen in caliciviruses.

== Attachment during RNA synthesis ==
VPg must undergo post-translational nucleotidylation before it can act as a primer for replication. In picornavirius, 3Dpol (the RdRp) is able to synthesize VPg-pUpU-OH by using a polyA sequence within a stem-loop structure (cis-acting replication element), which often locates in the ORF, as a template. Furthermore, a 5' terminal cloverleaf is required in cis to form the 3Dpol preinitiation RNA replication complex involved in uridylylating VPg.

== Function as a 5' cap ==
Studies that used proteinase K to cleave VPg from the viral genome discovered that calicivirus vesicular exanthema virus lacking VPg is no longer infectious whereas poliovirus retains infectivity even with the absence of VPg. Because VPg sits at the 5' end of the genome, similar to eukaryotic 5' mRNA caps, several experiments were performed to explore its function in translation. Poliovirus utilizes an internal ribosome entry site (IRES) instead of a cap for translation initiation, abrogating the requirement of VPg in initial infection whereas studies with feline calicivirus confirmed that the VPg protein interacts directly with the cap-binding protein of the ribosome, eIF4E, and that this interaction is essential for viral translation.

== Sources ==
Principles of Virology by S.J. Flint, L.W. Enquist, V.R. Racaniello, A.M. Skalka (ISBN 1-55581-259-7)
