= Protomer =

Structural unit of an oligomeric protein

In structural biology, a protomer is the structural unit of an oligomeric protein. It is the smallest unit composed of at least one protein chain. The protomers associate to form a larger oligomer of two or more copies of this unit. Protomers usually arrange in cyclic symmetry to form closed point group symmetries.

The term was introduced by Chetverin to make nomenclature in the Na/K-ATPase enzyme unambiguous. This enzyme is composed of two subunits: a large, catalytic α subunit, and a smaller glycoprotein β subunit (plus a proteolipid, called γ-subunit). At the time it was unclear how many of each work together. In addition, when people spoke of a dimer, it was unclear whether they were referring to αβ or to (αβ)_{2}. Chetverin suggested to call αβ a protomer and (αβ)_{2} a diprotomer. Thus, in the work by Chetverin the term protomer was only applied to a hetero-oligomer and subsequently used mainly in the context of hetero-oligomers. Following this usage, a protomer consists of a least two different proteins chains. In current literature of structural biology, the term is commonly also applied to the smallest unit of homo-oligomers, avoiding the term "monomer".

In chemistry, a so-called protomer is a molecule which displays tautomerism due to position of a proton.

== Examples ==
Hemoglobin is a heterotetramer consisting of four subunits (two α and two β). However, structurally and functionally hemoglobin is described better as (αβ)_{2}, so we call it a dimer of two αβ-protomers, that is, a diprotomer.

Aspartate carbamoyltransferase has a α_{6}β_{6} subunit composition. The six αβ-protomers are arranged in D_{3} symmetry.

Viral capsids are usually composed of protomers.

HIV-1 protease forms a homodimer consisting of two protomers.

Examples in chemistry include tyrosine and 4-aminobenzoic acid. The former may be deprotonated to form the carboxylate and phenoxide anions, and the later may be protonated at the amino or carboxyl groups.
