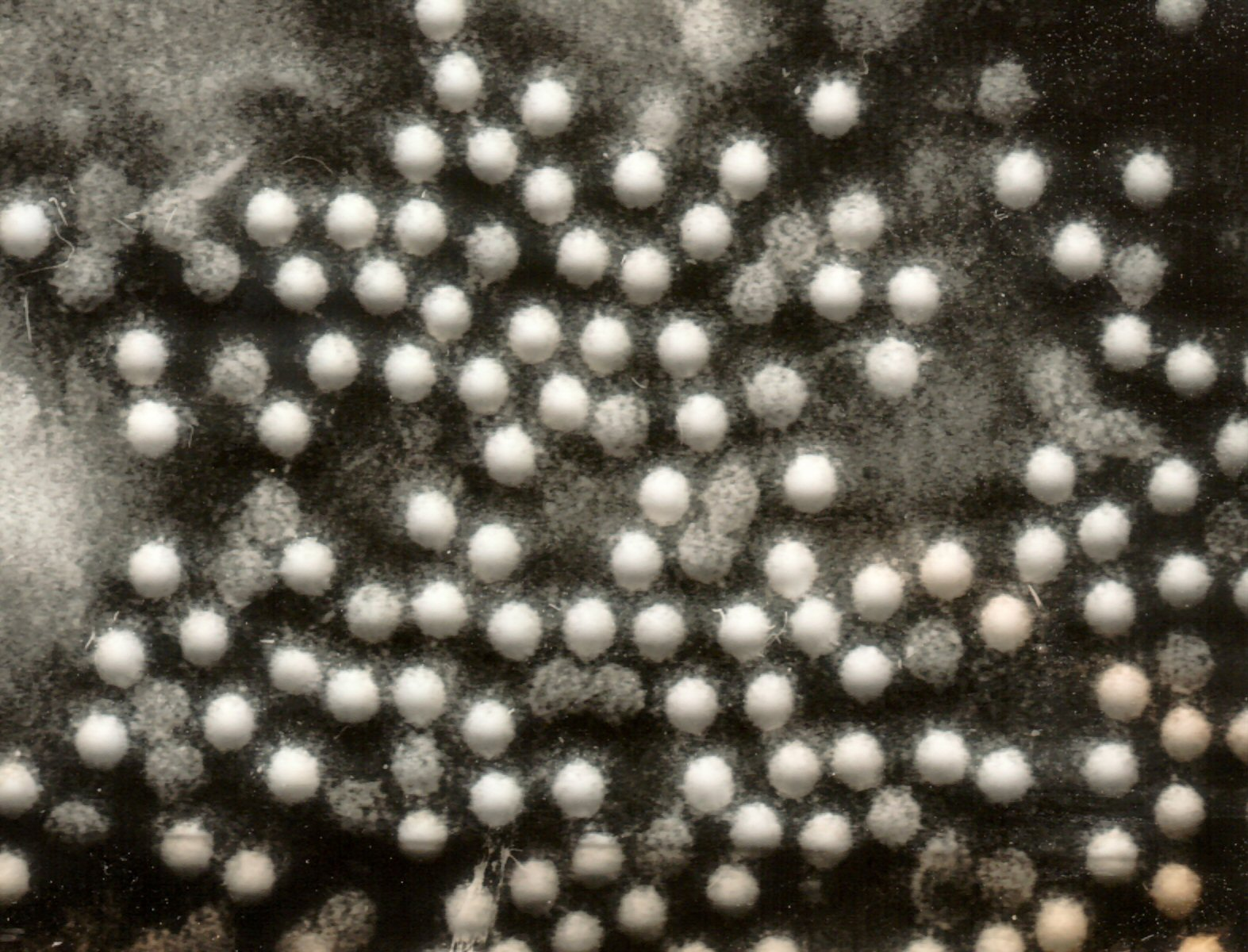
- Electronmicrograph of poliovirus
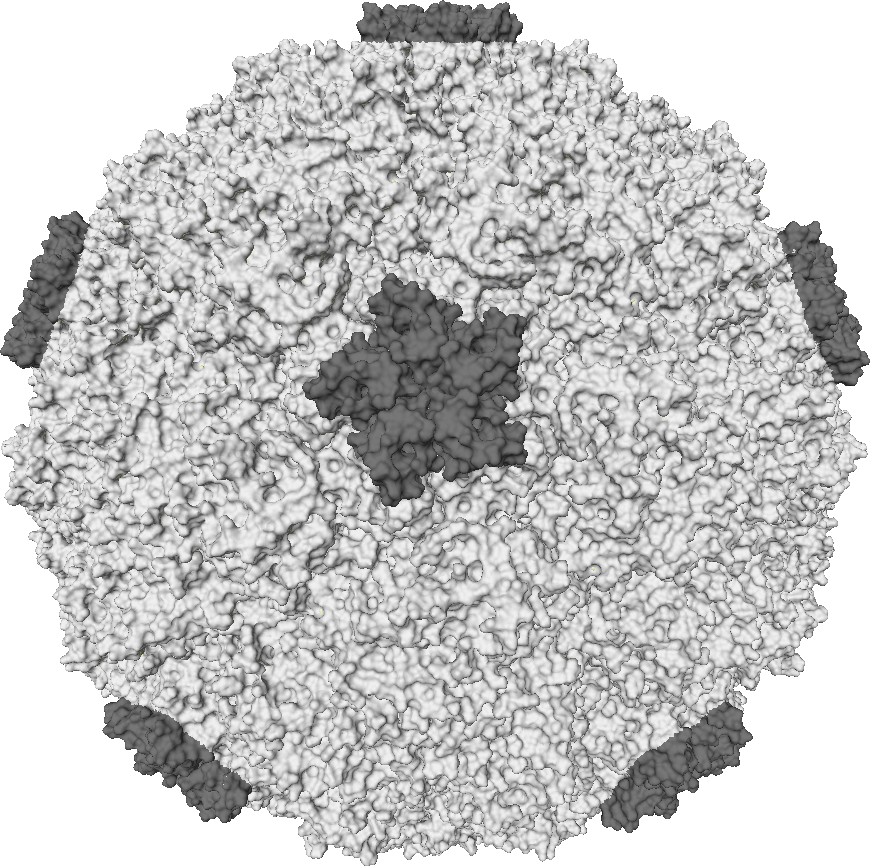
- Isosurface of a human rhinovirus showing protein spikes

Virus classification
- (unranked): Virus
- Realm: Riboviria
- Kingdom: Orthornavirae
- Phylum: Pisuviricota
- Class: Pisoniviricetes
- Order: Picornavirales
- Family: Picornaviridae

Genera
- See text

= Picornavirus =

Picornaviridae

Family of viruses

Picornaviruses are a group of related nonenveloped RNA viruses which infect vertebrates including fish, mammals, and birds. They are viruses that represent a large family of small, positive-sense, single-stranded RNA viruses with a 30 nm icosahedral capsid. The viruses in this family can cause a range of diseases including the common cold, poliomyelitis, meningitis, hepatitis, and paralysis.

Picornaviruses constitute the family Picornaviridae, order Picornavirales, and realm Riboviria. There are 159 species in this family, assigned to 68 genera, most of which belong to 5 subfamilies. Notable examples are genera Enterovirus (including Rhinovirus and Poliovirus), Aphthovirus, Cardiovirus, and Hepatovirus.

== Etymology ==
The name "picornavirus" has a dual etymology. Firstly, the name derives from picorna-, which is an acronym for "poliovirus, insensitivity to ether, coxsackievirus, orphan virus, rhinovirus, and ribonucleic acid". Secondly, the name derives from pico-, which designates a very small unit of measurement (equivalent to 10^{−12}), combined with rna to describe this group of very small RNA viruses.

== History ==
The first animal virus discovered (1897) was the foot-and-mouth disease virus (FMDV). It is the prototypic member of the genus Aphthovirus in the Picornaviridae family. The plaque assay was developed using poliovirus; the discovery of viral replication in culture was also with poliovirus in 1949. This was the first time that infectious virus had been produced in cultured cells. Polyprotein synthesis, internal ribosome entry sites, and uncapped mRNA were all discovered by studying poliovirus infected cells, and a poliovirus clone was the first infectious DNA clone made of an RNA virus in animals. Along with rhinovirus, poliovirus was the first animal virus to have its structure determined by x-ray crystallography. RNA dependent RNA polymerase was discovered in Mengovirus, a genus of picornaviruses.

== Virology ==
=== Structure ===
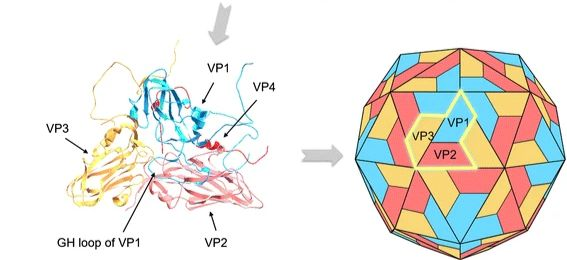
FMDV structural proteins VP1, VP2, VP3, and VP4 form the biological protomer and icosahedral capsid.

Picornaviruses are nonenveloped, with an icosahedral capsid. The capsid is an arrangement of 60 protomers in a tightly packed icosahedral structure. Each protomer consists of four polypeptides known as VP (viral protein) 1, 2, 3 and 4. VP2 and VP4 polypeptides originate from one protomer known as VP0 that is cleaved to give the different capsid components. The icosahedral capsid is said to have a triangulation number of 3, this means that in the icosahedral structure each of the 60 triangles that make up the capsid are split into three little triangles with a subunit on the corner.

Many picornaviruses have a deep cleft formed by around each of the 12 vertices of icosahedrons. The outer surface of the capsid is composed of regions of VP1, VP2, and VP3. Around each of the vertices is a canyon lined with the C termini of VP1 and VP3. The interior surface of the capsid is composed of VP4 and the N termini of VP1. J. Esposito and Frederick A. Murphy demonstrates cleft structure referred to as canyons, using X-ray crystallography and cryoelectron microscopy.

Depending on the type and degree of dehydration, the viral particle is around 30–32 nm in diameter. The viral genome is around 2500 nm in length, so it is tightly packaged within the capsid along with substances such as sodium ions to balance the negative charges on the RNA caused by the phosphate groups.

=== Genome ===
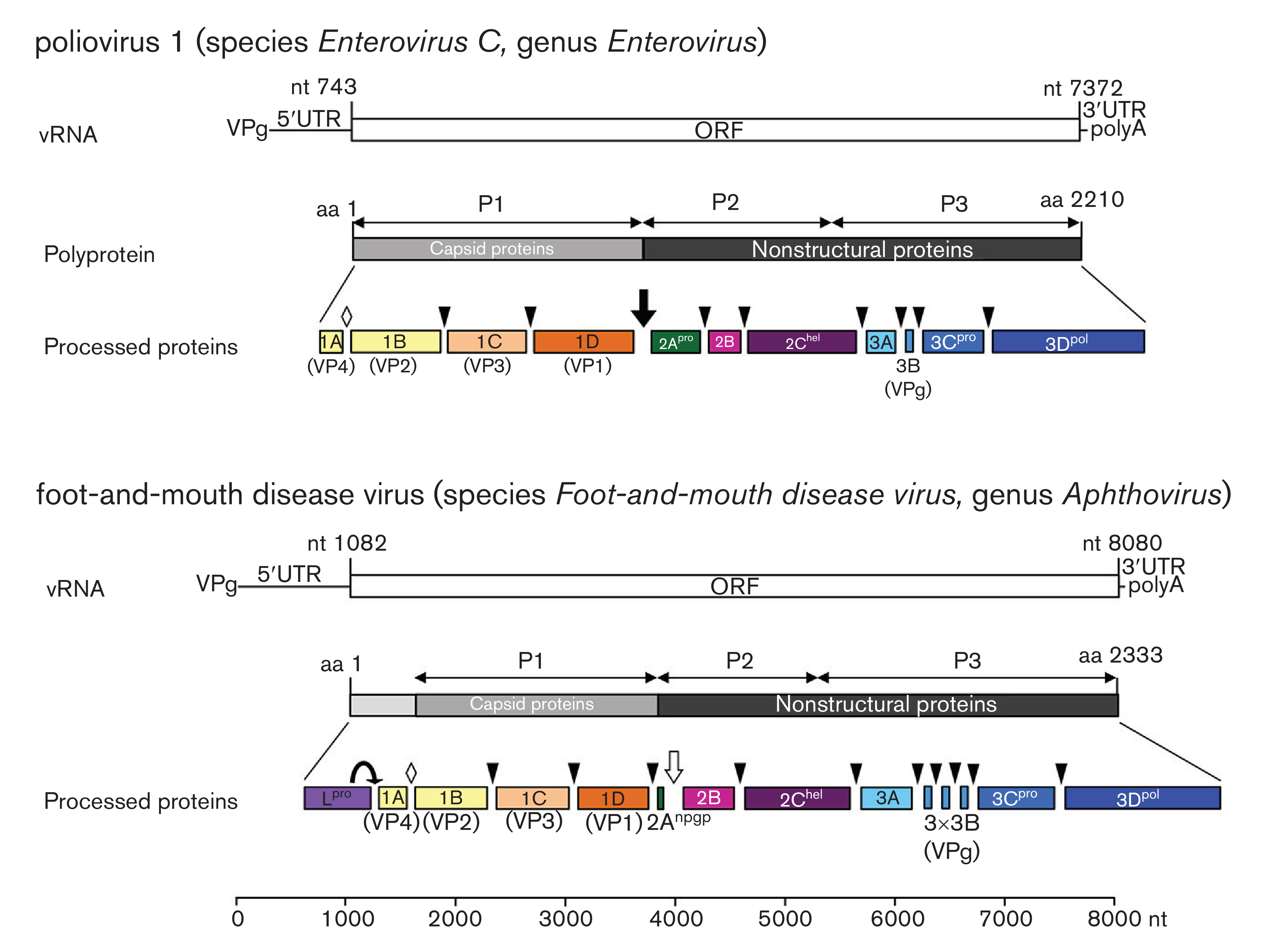
Genome organization and proteins of enteroviruses and aphthoviruses

Picornaviruses are classed under Baltimore's viral classification system as group IV viruses, as they contain a single-stranded, positive-sense RNA genome. Their genome ranges between 6.7 and 10.1 (kilobases) in length. Like most positive-sense RNA genomes, the genetic material alone is infectious; although substantially less virulent than if contained within the viral particle, the RNA can have increased infectivity when transfected into cells. The genome RNA is unusual because it has a protein on the 5' end that is used as a primer for transcription by RNA polymerase. This primer is called VPg genome, and it ranges between 2 and 3 kb. VPg contain tyrosine residue at the 3' end. Tyrosine as a –OH source for covalently linked to 5' end of RNA.

The genome is not segmented and positive-sense (the same sense as mammalian mRNA, being read 5' to 3'). Unlike mammalian mRNA, picornaviruses do not have a 5' cap, but a virally encoded protein known as VPg. However, like mammalian mRNA, the genome does have a poly(A) tail at the 3' end. An untranslated region (UTR) is found at both ends of the picornavirus genome. The 5' UTR is usually longer, being around 500–1200 nucleotides (nt) in length, compared to that of the 3' UTR, which is around 30–650 nt. The 5' UTR is thought to be important in translation, and the 3' in negative-strand synthesis; however, the 5' end may also have a role to play in virulence of the virus. The rest of the genome encodes structural proteins at the 5' end and nonstructural proteins at the 3' end in a single polyprotein.

The polyprotein is organised as: L-1ABCD-2ABC-3ABCD with each letter representing a protein, but variations to this layout exist.

The 1A, 1B, 1C, and 1D proteins are the capsid proteins VP4, VP2, VP3, and VP1, respectively. Virus-coded proteases perform the cleavages, some of which are intramolecular. The polyprotein is first cut to yield P1, P2, and P3. P1 becomes myristylated at the N terminus before being cleaved to VP0, VP3, and VP1, the proteins that will form procapsids; VP0 will later be cleaved to produce VP2 and VP4. Other cleavage products include 3B (VPg), 2C (an ATPase), and 3D (the RNA polymerase).

=== Replication ===
==== RNA elements ====
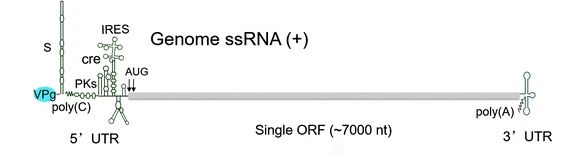
Foot-and-mouth disease virus genome and RNA structural elements

Genomic RNAs of picornaviruses possess multiple RNA elements, and they are required for both negative- and positive-strand RNA synthesis. The cis-acting replication element (CRE) is required for replication. The stem-loop-structure that contains the CRE is independent of position, but changes with location between virus types when it has been identified. Also, the 3' end elements of viral RNA are significant and efficient for RNA replication of picornaviruses. The 3' end of picornavirus contains a poly(A) tract, which is required for infectivity. RNA synthesis, though, is hypothesized to occur in this region. The 3' end NCR of poliovirus is not necessary for negative-strand synthesis, but is important element for positive–strand synthesis. Additionally, the 5' end NCR that contains secondary structural elements is required for RNA replication and poliovirus translation initiation. Internal ribosome entry sites are RNA structures that allow cap-independent initiation of translation, and are able to initiate translation in the middle of a messenger RNA.

==== Lifecycle ====
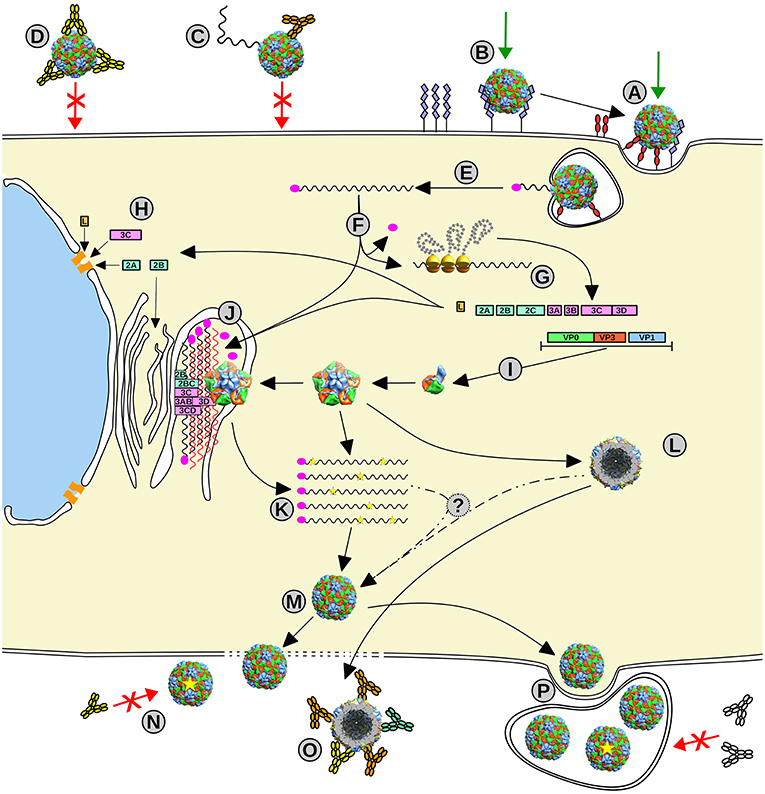
Picornavirus life cycle

The viral particle binds to cell surface receptors. Cell surface receptors are characterized for each serotype of picornaviruses. For example, poliovirus receptor is glycoprotein CD155, which is special receptor for human and some other primate species. For this reason, poliovirus could not be made in many laboratories until transgenic mice having a CD155 receptor on their cell surfaces were developed in the 1990s. These animals can be infected and used for studies of replication and pathogenesis. Binding causes a conformational change in the viral capsid proteins, and myristic acid is released. The acid forms a pore in the cell membrane through which RNA is injected.

While the prototype poliovirus model relies on a single receptor (CD155) to trigger both attachment and uncoating, many enteroviruses utilize a multi-step, multi-protein mechanism for entry. For instance, several serotypes of Echovirus (such as Echovirus 7 and 11) bind to decay-accelerating factor (DAF; also known as CD55) on the host cell surface. Structural and biochemical analyses demonstrate that CD55 acts strictly as an attachment factor rather than a true uncoating receptor; binding occurs outside the viral canyon near the icosahedral twofold axes and does not catalyze the destabilization of the native virion or the formation of 135S "A-particles". Internalization and subsequent genome uncoating require the virus to engage secondary extracellular and intracellular factors. Early research in 1999 established that physiological concentrations of serum albumin actively regulate this pathway, with normal, fatty-acid loaded albumin reversibly blocking echovirus uncoating and protecting the particle in extracellular spaces; this may be a key factor in viral tropism. Moreover, this albumin blocking affect on viral infection is an early example of a protein corona that pre dates the term 'Viral Protein Corona ' as now used in nanoscience where these viruses are considered as nano particles. Conversely, interaction with modified or fatty-acid-depleted albumin can prime the virus, releasing the hydrophobic "pocket factor" and shifting the capsid into a metastable, fenestrated intermediate state that prepares the genome for release upon encountering endosomal ionic environments. In 2019, independent studies identified the neonatal Fc receptor (FcRn)—a cell-surface glycoprotein that physiologically binds and regulates albumin and IgG homeostasis as a pan-echovirus and primary uncoating receptor for major Enterovirus B species. Virus pre- primed by fatty acid deplete albumin, induces binding of FcRn inside the viral canyon, and forces further structural transitions, prompting viral uncoating

Once inside the cell, the RNA uncoats and the (+) strand RNA genome is replicated through a double-stranded RNA intermediate that is formed using viral RNA-dependent RNA polymerase. Translation by host-cell ribosomes is not initiated by a 5' G cap as usual, but rather is initiated by an internal ribosome entry site. The viral life cycle is very rapid, with the whole process of replication being completed on average within 8 hours. As little as 30 minutes after initial infection, though, cell protein synthesis declines to almost zero output – essentially the macromolecular synthesis of cell proteins is shut off. Over the next 1–2 hours, a loss of margination of chromatin and homogeneity occurs in the nucleus, before the viral proteins start to be synthesized and a vacuole appears in the cytoplasm close to the nucleus that gradually starts to spread as the time after infection reaches around 3 hours. After this time, the cell plasma membrane becomes permeable; at 4–6 hours, the virus particles assemble, and can sometimes be seen in the cytoplasm. Around 8 hours, the cell is effectively dead, and lyses to release the viral particles.

Experimental data from single-step growth curve-like experiments have allowed observation of the replication of the picornaviruses in great detail. The whole of replication occurs within the host-cell cytoplasm and infection can even happen in cells that do not contain a nucleus (enucleated) and those treated with actinomycin D (this antibiotic would inhibit viral replication if this occurred in the nucleus.)

Translation takes place by -1 ribosomal frameshifting, viral initiation, and ribosomal skipping. The virus exits in host cell by lysis, and viroporins. Vertebrates serve as the natural hosts. Transmission routes are fecal-oral, contact, ingestion, and air-borne particles.

==== Viral protein (VPg) ====
Picornaviruses have a viral protein (VPg) covalently linked to 5' end of their genomes instead of 7-methylguanosine cap like cellular mRNAs. Virus RNA polymerases use VPg as primer. VPg as primer uses both positive- and negative-strand RNA synthesis. Picornavirus replication is initiated by the uridylylation of VPg. It is uridylylated at the hydroxyl group of a tyrosine residue. A VPg primer mechanism is used by the picornavirus (entero- aphtho-, and others), additional virus groups (poty-, como-, calici-, and others) and picornavirus-like (coronavirus, notavirus, etc.) supergroup of RNA viruses. The mechanism has been best studied for the enteroviruses (which include many human pathogens, such as poliovirus and coxsackie viruses), as well as for the aphthovirus, an animal pathogen causing foot-and-mouth disease.

In this group, primer-dependent RNA synthesis uses a small 22– to 25-amino acid-long viral protein linked to the VPg to initiate polymerase activity, where the primer is covalently bound to the 5' end of the RNA template. The uridylylation occurs at a tyrosine residue at the third position of the VPg. A CRE, which is a RNA stem loop structure, serves as a template for the uridylylation of VPg, resulting in the synthesis of VPgpUpUOH. Mutations within the CRE-RNA structure prevent VPg uridylylation, and mutations within the VPg sequence can severely diminish RdRp catalytic activity. While the tyrosine hydroxyl of VPg can prime negative-strand RNA synthesis in a CRE- and VPgpUpUOH-independent manner, CRE-dependent VPgpUpUOH synthesis is absolutely required for positive-strand RNA synthesis. CRE-dependent VPg uridylylation lowers the K_{m} of UTP required for viral RNA replication and CRE-dependent VPgpUpUOH synthesis, and is required for efficient negative-strand RNA synthesis, especially when UTP concentrations are limiting. The VPgpUpUOH primer is transferred to the 3’ end of the RNA template for elongation, which can continue by addition of nucleotide bases by RdRp. Partial crystal structures for VPgs of foot and mouth disease virus and coxsackie virus B3 suggest that there may be two sites on the viral polymerase for the small VPgs of the picornaviruses. NMR solution structures of poliovirus VPg and VPgpU show that uridylylation stabilizes the structure of the VPg, which is otherwise quite flexible in solution. The second site may be used for uridylylation, after which the VPgpU can initiate RNA synthesis. The VPg primers of caliciviruses, whose structures are only beginning to be revealed, are much larger than those of the picornaviruses. Mechanisms for uridylylation and priming may be quite different in all of these groups.

VPg uridylylation may include the use of precursor proteins, allowing for the determination of a possible mechanism for the location of the diuridylylated, VPg-containing precursor at the 3' end of positive- or negative-strand RNA for production of full-length RNA. Determinants of VPg uridylylation efficiency suggest formation and/or collapse or release of the uridylylated product as the rate-limiting step in vitro depending upon the VPg donor employed. Precursor proteins also have an effect on VPg-CRE specificity and stability. The upper RNA stem loop, to which VPg binds, has a significant impact on both retention, and recruitment, of VPg and Pol. The stem loop of CRE will partially unwind, allowing the precursor components to bind and recruit VPg and Pol4. The CRE loop has a defined consensus sequence to which the initiation components bind, but no consensus sequence exists for the supporting stem, which suggests that only the structural stability of the CRE is important.

==== Assembly and organization of the picornavirus VPg ribonucleoprotein complex ====
1. Two 3CD (VPg complex) molecules bind to CRE with the 3C domains (VPg domain) contacting the upper stem and the 3D domains (VPg domain) contacting the lower stem.
2. The 3C dimer opens the RNA stem by forming a more stable interaction with single strands forming the stem.
3. 3Dpol is recruited to and retained in this complex by a physical interaction between the back-of-the-thumb subdomain of 3Dpol and a surface of one or both 3C subdomains of 3CD.

VPg may also play an important role in specific recognition of viral genome by movement proteins (MP), which are nonstructural proteins encoded by many, if not all, plant viruses to enable their movement from one infected cell to neighboring cells. MP and VPg interact to provide specificity for the transport of viral RNA from cell to cell. To fulfill energy requirements, MP also interacts with P10, which is a cellular ATPase.

== Diseases ==
Picornaviruses cause a range of diseases. Enteroviruses of the picornavirus family infect the enteric tract, which is reflected in their name. Rhinoviruses infect primarily the nose and the throat. Enteroviruses replicate at 37 °C, whereas rhinoviruses grow better at 33 °C, as this is the lower temperature of the nose. Enteroviruses are stable under acidic conditions, thus they are able to survive exposure to gastric acid. In contrast, rhinoviruses are acid-labile (inactivated or destroyed by low pH conditions), so rhinovirus infections are restricted to the nose and throat.

== Taxonomy ==
The family Picornaviridae contains five subfamilies that contain 66 genera. Another two genera are unassigned to subfamilies. These taxa are listed hereafter (-virinae denotes subfamily and -virus denotes genus).

- Caphthovirinae
  - Ailurivirus
  - Aphthovirus
  - Bopivirus
  - Cardiovirus
  - Cosavirus
  - Erbovirus
  - Hunnivirus
  - Malagasivirus
  - Marsupivirus
  - Mischivirus
  - Mosavirus
  - Mupivirus
  - Senecavirus
  - Teschovirus
  - Torchivirus
  - Tottorivirus
- Ensavirinae
  - Anativirus
  - Boosepivirus
  - Diresapivirus
  - Enterovirus
  - Felipivirus
  - Parabovirus
  - Rabovirus
  - Sapelovirus
- Heptrevirinae
  - Caecilivirus
  - Crahelivirus
  - Fipivirus
  - Gruhelivirus
  - Hepatovirus
  - Rohelivirus
  - Tremovirus
- Kodimesavirinae
  - Danipivirus
  - Dicipivirus
  - Gallivirus
  - Hemipivirus
  - Kobuvirus
  - Livupivirus
  - Ludopivirus
  - Megrivirus
  - Myrropivirus
  - Oscivirus
  - Passerivirus
  - Pemapivirus
  - Poecivirus
  - Pygoscepivirus
  - Rafivirus
  - Rajidapivirus
  - Rosavirus
  - Sakobuvirus
  - Salivirus
  - Sicinivirus
  - Symapivirus
  - Tropivirus
- Paavivirinae
  - Aalivirus
  - Aquamavirus
  - Avihepatovirus
  - Avisivirus
  - Crohivirus
  - Grusopivirus
  - Kunsagivirus
  - Limnipivirus
  - Orivirus
  - Parechovirus
  - Pasivirus
  - Potamipivirus
  - Shanbavirus
- Unassigned to a subfamily:
  - Ampivirus
  - Harkavirus

== See also ==
- Animal viruses
