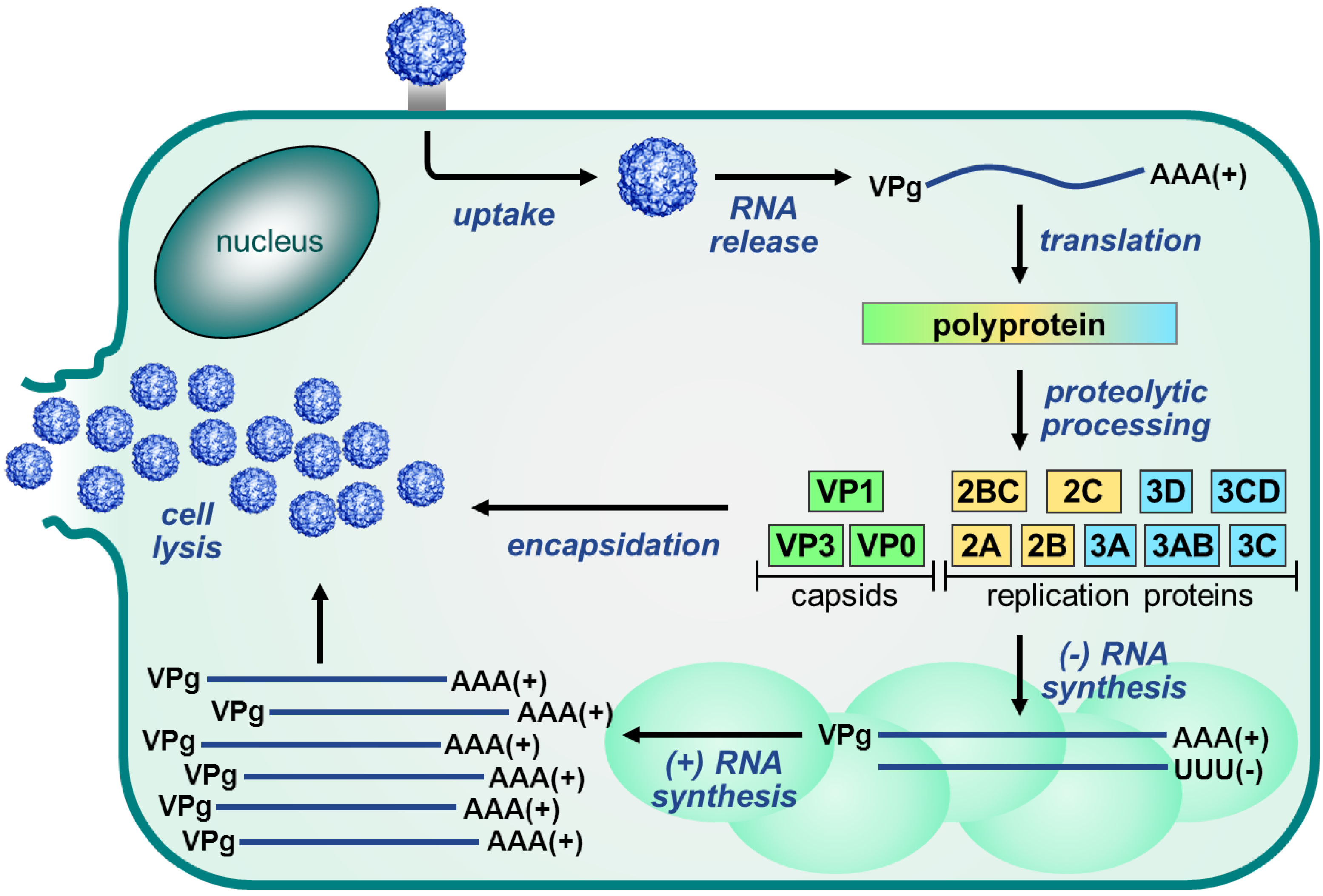
- Picornavirus replication cycle

Virus classification
- (unranked): Virus
- Realm: Riboviria
- Kingdom: Orthornavirae
- Phylum: Pisuviricota
- Class: Pisoniviricetes
- Order: Picornavirales

= Picornavirales =

Order of viruses

Picornavirales is an order of viruses with vertebrate, invertebrate, protist and plant hosts. The name has a dual etymology. First, picorna- is an acronym for poliovirus, insensitivity to ether, coxsackievirus, orphan virus, rhinovirus, and ribonucleic acid. Secondly, pico-, meaning extremely small, combines with RNA to describe these very small RNA viruses. The order comprises viruses that historically are referred to as picorna-like viruses.

== Characteristics ==
The families within this order share a number of common features:

- The virions are non-enveloped, icosahedral, and about 30 nanometers in diameter.
- The capsid has a "pseudo T=3" structure, and is composed of 60 protomers each made of three similar-sized but nonidentical beta barrels.
- The genome is made of one or a few single-stranded RNA(s) serving directly as mRNA, without overlapping open reading frames.
- The genome has a small protein, VPg, covalently attached to its 5' end, and usually a poly-adenylated 3' end.
- Each genome RNA is translated into polyprotein(s) yielding mature viral proteins through one or several virus-encoded proteinase(s).
- A hallmark of the Picornavirales is a conserved module of sequence domains, Hel-Pro-Pol, which is typical of (from the amino- to the carboxy-end of the polyprotein):
  - A helicase belonging to superfamily III
  - [the VPg is encoded between these two domains]
  - A chymotrypsin-like protease where the catalytic residue is typically a cysteine rather than a serine,
  - A polymerase belonging to superfamily I; this conserved module is a hallmark of the Picornavirales

The evolution of picorna-like viruses seems to have antedated the separation of eukaryotes into the extant crown groups.

== Taxonomy ==
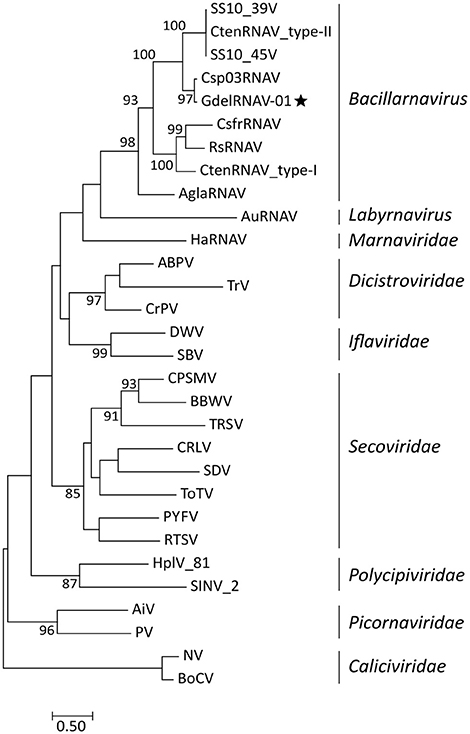
Phylogenetic tree of representative viruses from order Picornavirales

The following families are recognized:

- Caliciviridae
- Dicistroviridae
- Iflaviridae
- Marnaviridae
- Noraviridae
- Picornaviridae
- Polycipiviridae
- Secoviridae
- Solinviviridae
