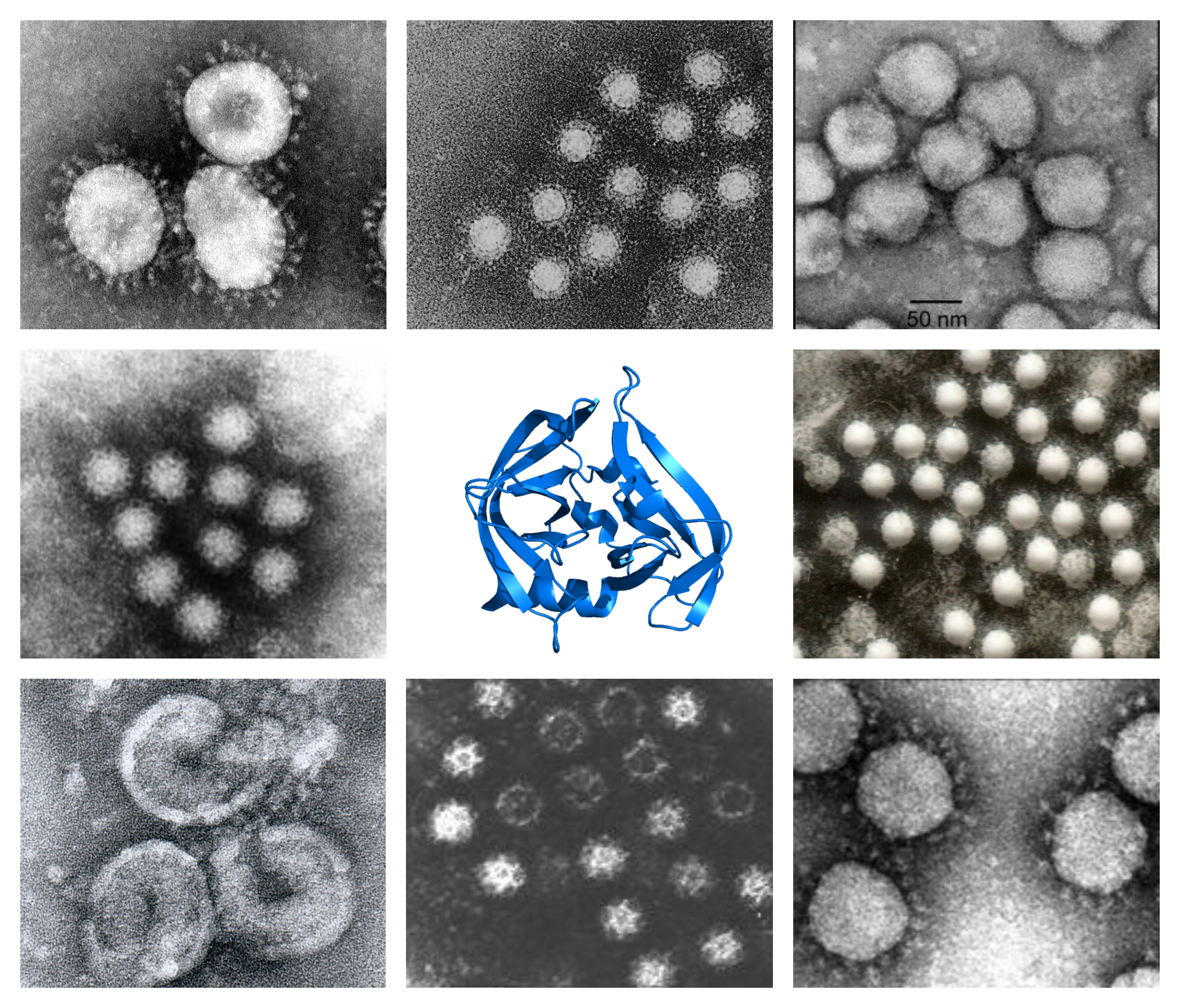
- Clockwise from top left: TEM of avian coronavirus, hepatitis A virus, Nam Dinh virus, polio virus, transmissible gastroenteritis coronavirus, calicivirus, equine torovirus, Norwalk virus. Center: Picornain 3C – a 3C-like protease characteristic of class Pisoniviricetes

Virus classification
- (unranked): Virus
- Realm: Riboviria
- Kingdom: Orthornavirae
- Phylum: Pisuviricota
- Class: Pisoniviricetes

= Pisoniviricetes =

Class of viruses

Pisoniviricetes is a class of positive-strand RNA viruses which infect eukaryotes. A characteristic of the group is a conserved 3C-like protease from the PA clan of proteases for processing the translated polyprotein. The name of the group is a portmanteau of member orders "picornavirales, sobelivirales, nidovirales" and -viricetes which is the suffix for a virus class.

== Orders ==
The following orders are recognized:

- Nidovirales
- Picornavirales
- Sobelivirales
