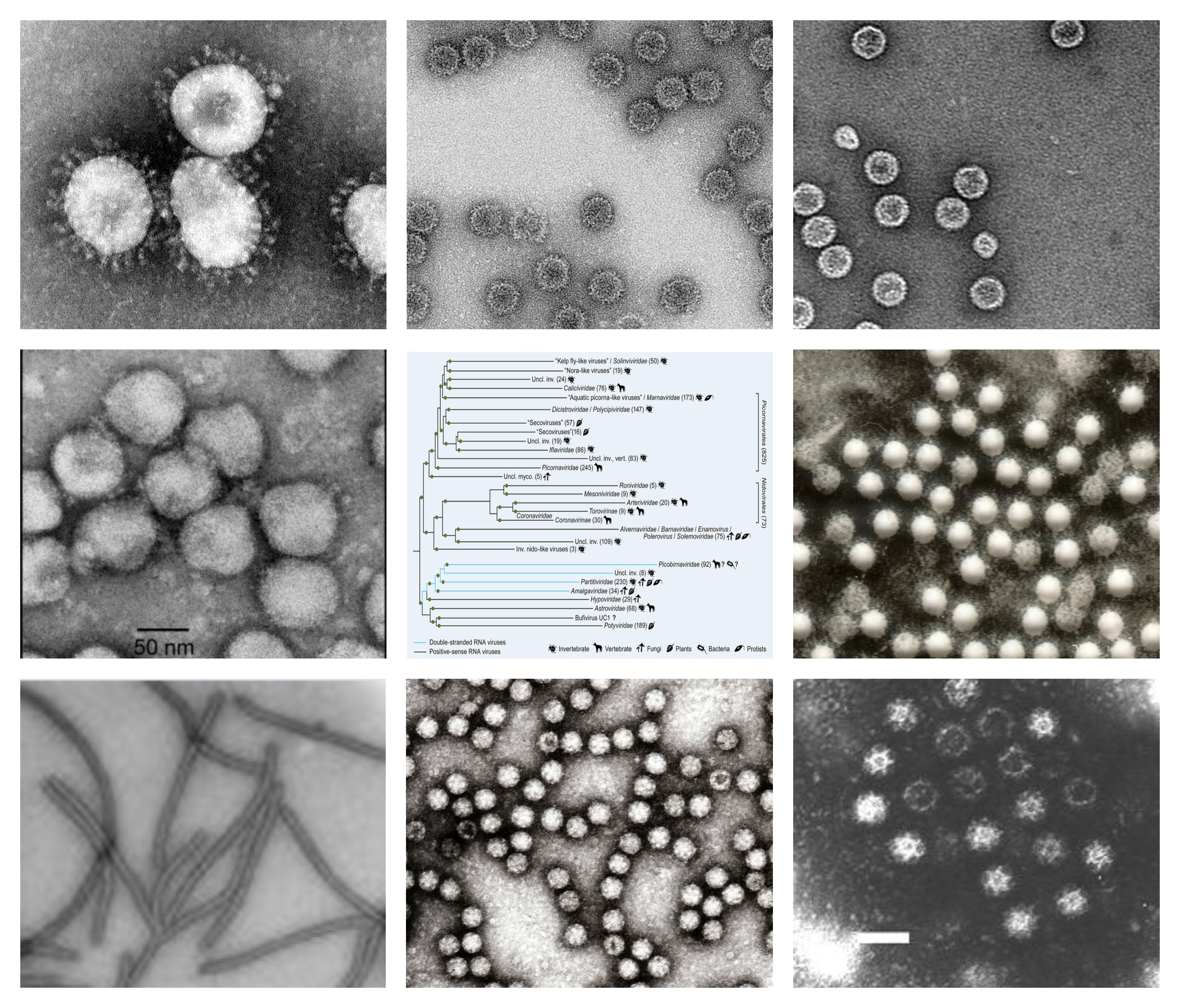
- Clockwise from top left: TEM of avian coronavirus, Penicillium stoloniferum virus S, picobirnavirus, polio virus, calicivirus, astrovirus, plum pox virus, Nam Dinh virus. Center: phylogenetic tree of phylum Pisuviricota

Virus classification
- (unranked): Virus
- Realm: Riboviria
- Kingdom: Orthornavirae
- Phylum: Pisuviricota

= Pisuviricota =

Phylum of viruses

Pisuviricota is a phylum of RNA viruses that includes all positive-strand and double-stranded RNA viruses that infect eukaryotes and are not members of the phyla Kitrinoviricota, Lenarviricota or Duplornaviricota. The name of the group is a syllabic abbreviation of "picornavirus supergroup" with the suffix -viricota, indicating a virus phylum. Phylogenetic analyses suggest that Birnaviridae and Permutotetraviridae, both currently unassigned to a phylum in Orthornavirae, also belong to this phylum and that both are sister groups.

== Classification ==
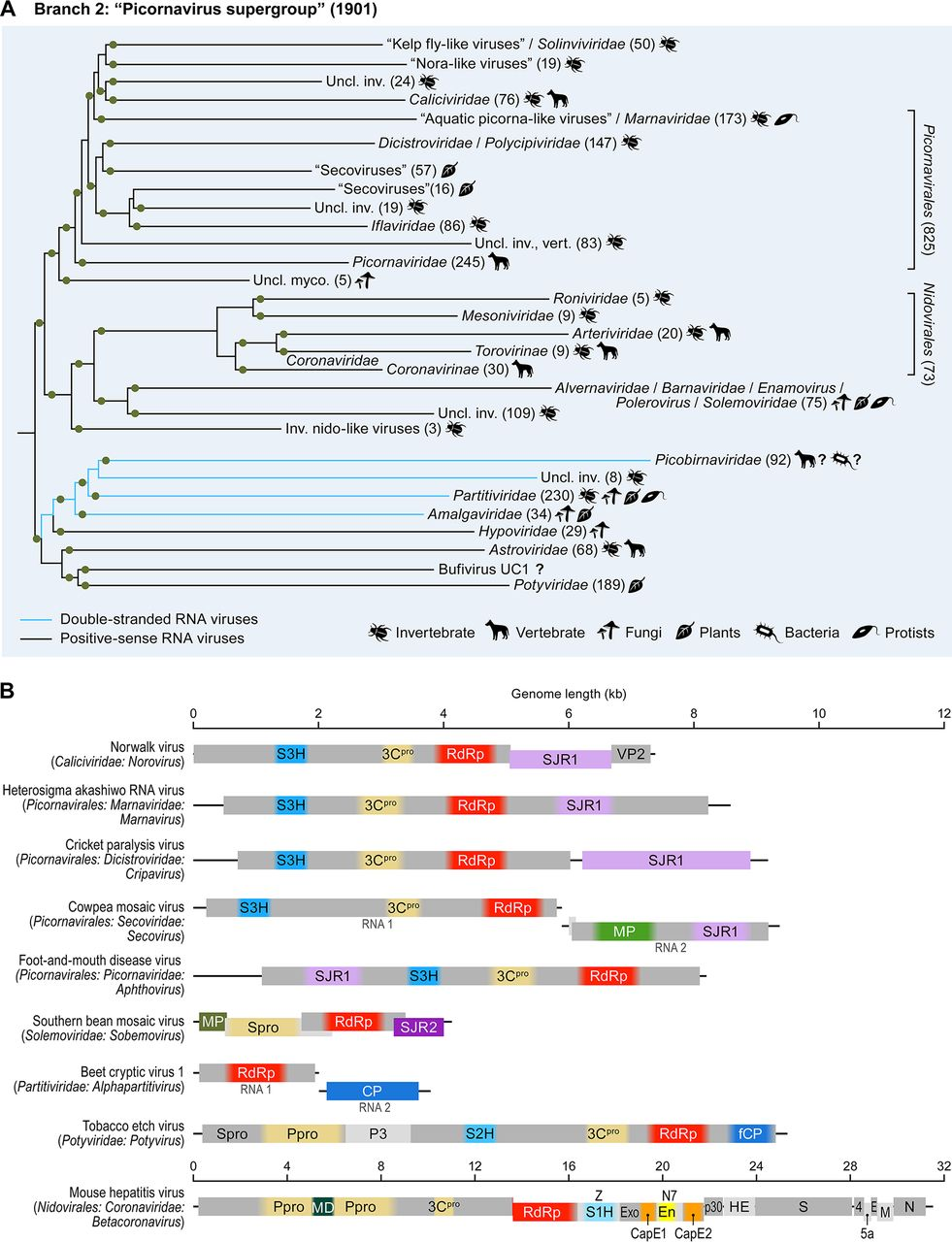
Phylogenetic tree of Pisuviricota (top), genome of different members and major conserved proteins (bottom) (Note: 3Cpro, 3C chymotrypsin-like protease; CP, capsid protein; E, envelope protein; En, nidoviral uridylate-specific endoribonuclease (NendoU); Exo, 3′-to-5′ exoribonuclease domain; fCP, capsid protein forming filamentous virions; M, membrane protein; MD, macrodomain; MP, movement protein; MT, ribose-2-O-methyltransferase domain; N, nucleocapsid protein; N7, guanine-N7-methyltransferase; Ppro, papain-like protease; SJR1 and SJR2, single jelly-roll capsid proteins of type 1 and type 2; spike, spike protein; S1H, superfamily 1 helicase; S2H, superfamily 2 helicase; S3H, superfamily 3 helicase; VP2, virion protein 2; Z, Zn-finger domain; Spro, serine protease; P3, protein 3. Distinct hues of same color (e.g., green for MPs) are used to indicate cases where proteins that share analogous function are not homologous.)

The phylum contains the following classes:

- Duplopiviricetes
- Mycopleornaviricetes
- Pisoniviricetes
- Stelpaviricetes

Additionally, the order Yadokarivirales is unassigned to a class.
