= List of Persian walnut diseases =

This article is a list of diseases of Persian Walnuts (Juglans regia).

== Bacterial diseases ==
Bacterial diseases
| Crown gall | Agrobacterium tumefaciens |
| Deep bark canker | Erwinia rubrifaciens |
| Shallow bark canker | Erwinia (now Brenneria) nigrifluens |
| Walnut blight | Xanthomonas campestris pv. juglandis |

== Fungal diseases ==
Fungal diseases
| Anthracnose | Gnomonia leptostyla Marssonina juglandis [anamorph] |
| Armillaria root rot | Armillaria mellea |
| Branch wilt | Hendersonula toruloidea |
| Cotton root rot | Phymatotrichopsis omnivora = Phymatotrichum omnivorum |
| Cylindrocarpon dieback | Nectria radicicola Cylindrocarpon destructans [anamorph] = Cylindrocarpon radicicola |
| Downy leaf spot | Microstroma juglandis |
| Melanconium dieback | Melanconis carthusiana Melanconium juglandinum [anamorph] |
| Phytophthora crown and root rot | Phytophthora spp. Phytophthora cactorum Phytophthora cinnamomi Phytophthora citricola Phytophthora citrophthora Phytophthora cryptogea Phytophthora drechsleri Phytophthora megasperma Phytophthora nicotianae = Phytophthora parasitica |
| Phytophthora trunk and branch canker | Phytophthora cactorum Phytophthora citricola Phytophthora citrophthora |

== Nematodes, parasitic ==
Nematodes, parasitic
| Pin nematode | Paratylenchus spp. |
| Ring nematode | Mesocriconema xenoplax |
| Root lesion nematode | Pratylenchus vulnus |
| Root knot nematode | Meloidogyne spp. |

== Viral diseases ==
Viral diseases
| Blackline | genus Nepovirus, Cherry leaf roll virus (CLRV) |
| Walnut ring spot | genus Nepovirus, Cherry leaf roll virus (CLRV) |

== Miscellaneous diseases and disorders ==
Miscellaneous diseases and disorders
| Alternaria leaf spot | Alternaria alternata |
| Apoplexy | Unknown |
| Ascochyta ring spot | Ascochyta juglandis |
| Mesophyll collapse | High temperature and low humidity |
| Oilless nuts | Unknown |
| Pistillate flower abscission | Excess pollen |
| Stem/trunk canker | Fusarium solani Botryosphaeria |
