= Melanconium juglandinum =

Scientific classification
- Kingdom: Fungi
- Division: Ascomycota
- Class: Sordariomycetes
- Order: Diaporthales
- Family: Melanconidaceae
- Genus: Melanconium
- Species: M. juglandinum

Binomial name
- Melanconium juglandinum Kunze, (1823)

Species of fungus

Melanconium juglandinum is a fungal pathogen.
