= Dicarpella dryina =

Scientific classification
- Kingdom: Fungi
- Division: Ascomycota
- Class: Sordariomycetes
- Order: Diaporthales
- Family: Melanconidaceae
- Genus: Dicarpella
- Species: D. dryina

Binomial name
- Dicarpella dryina Belisario & M.E. Barr, (1991)

Synonyms
- Actinopelte dryina Leptothyrium dryinum Tubakia dryina

Species of fungus

Dicarpella dryina is a species of fungus. It is a plant pathogen.
