= Wuestneiopsis georgiana =

Scientific classification
- Kingdom: Fungi
- Division: Ascomycota
- Class: Sordariomycetes
- Order: Diaporthales
- Family: Melanconidaceae
- Genus: Wuestneiopsis
- Species: W. georgiana

Binomial name
- Wuestneiopsis georgiana (J.H. Mill. & G.E. Thomps.) J. Reid & Dowsett, (1990)

Synonyms
- Dicarpella georgiana Gnomoniella georgiana

Species of fungus

Wuestneiopsis georgiana is a plant pathogen.
