= Giuseppe Gibelli =

Italian botanist and lichenologist (1831–1898)

Giuseppe Gibelli (9 February 1831 – 16 September 1898) was an Italian botanist and lichenologist who was a native of Santa Cristina e Bissone.

He originally studied medicine, earning his medical doctorate at the University of Pavia. Later he studied botany and microscopy in Germany. He became a professor of botany at the Universities of Modena (1874) and Bologna (1879), and from 1883 to 1898 was a professor of botany and director of the botanical garden at Turin.

Gibelli is remembered for his pioneer studies of mycorrhiza, the symbiotic association between fungus and plant roots. With Giovanni Passerini (1816-1893) and Vincenzo de Cesati (1806-1883), he was co-author of Compendio della flora italiana, a compendium of Italian flora.

He is honoured in the naming of Gibellia (1886), which is a genus of fungi within the Melanconidaceae family, Gibellina (1886), which is a genus of fungi in the family Magnaporthaceae, and also Gibellula (1894), which is a genus of fungi in the family Cordycipitaceae. Then in 1959, Gibellulopsis, a genus of fungi belonging to the family Plectosphaerellaceae.
