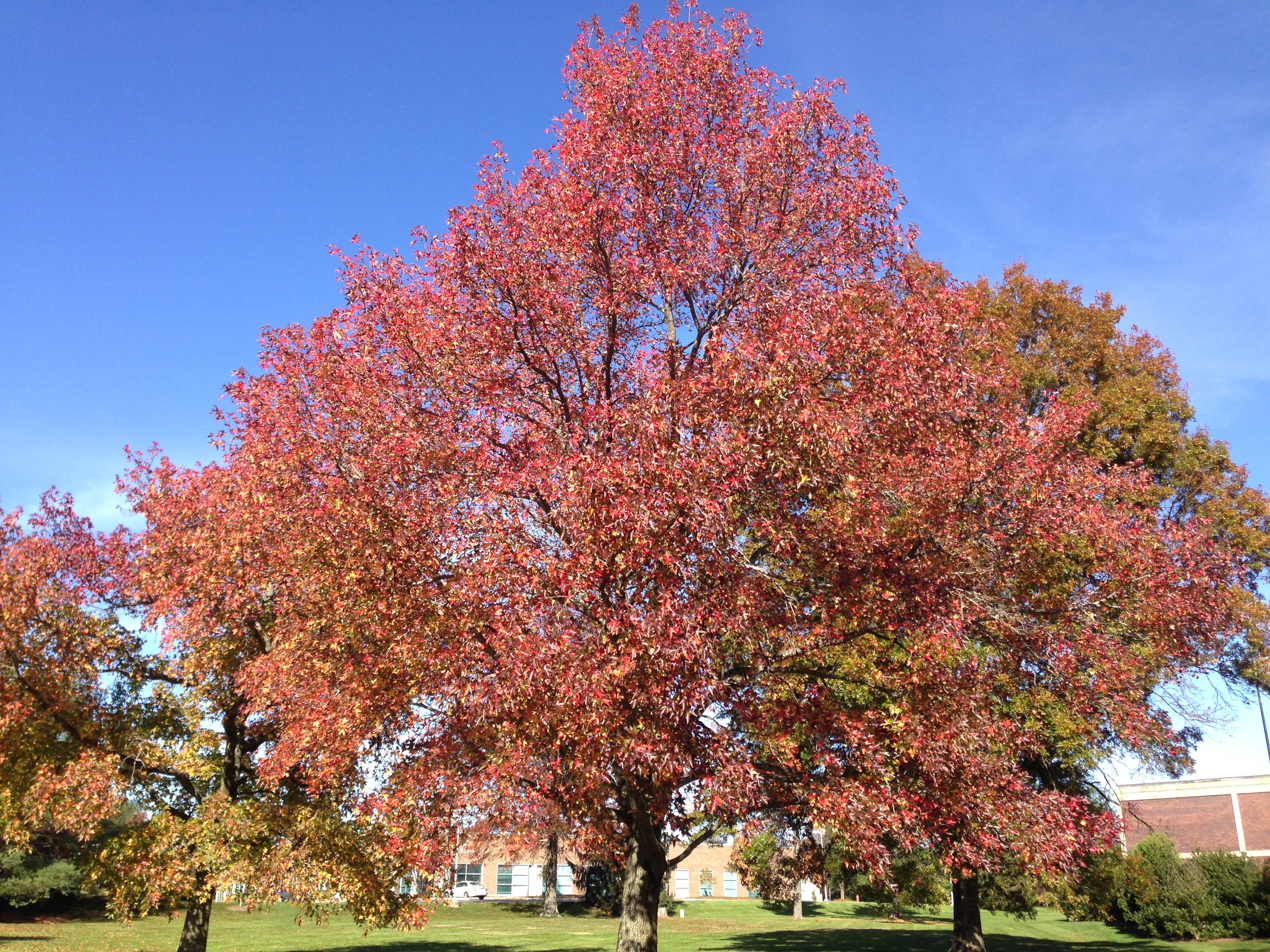

Conservation status
- Least Concern (IUCN 3.1)

Scientific classification
- Kingdom: Plantae
- Clade: Tracheophytes
- Clade: Angiosperms
- Clade: Eudicots
- Order: Saxifragales
- Family: Altingiaceae
- Genus: Liquidambar
- Species: L. styraciflua

Binomial name
- Liquidambar styraciflua L.
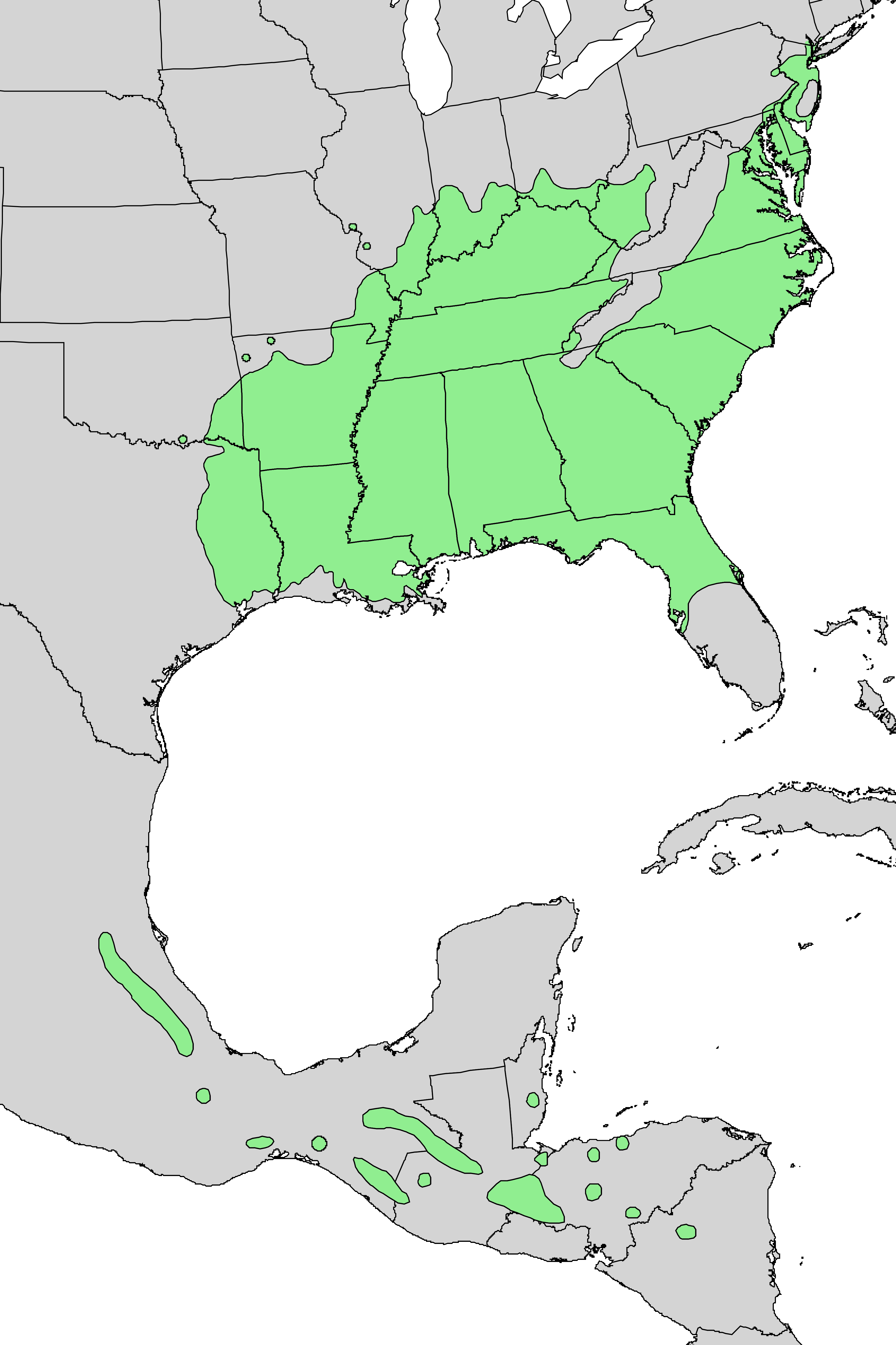
- Natural range of L. styraciflua

Synonyms
- Liquidambar gummifera Salisb. nom. superfl.; Liquidambar barbata Stokes; Liquidambar macrophylla Oerst.; Liquidambar tuberculata Silba

= Liquidambar styraciflua =

American sweetgum

Species of tree in North America

Liquidambar styraciflua, commonly known as the American sweetgum among other names, (Note: Also known as liquidambar, American storax, hazel pine, bilsted, redgum, satin-walnut, star-leaved gum, alligatorwood, gumball tree, or sweetgum) is a deciduous tree in the genus Liquidambar native to warm temperate areas of eastern North America and tropical montane regions of Mexico and Central America. Sweetgum is one of the main valuable forest trees in the southeastern United States, and is a popular ornamental tree in temperate climates. It is recognizable by the combination of its five-pointed star-shaped leaves (similar to maple leaves) and its hard, spiked fruits. It is currently classified in the plant family Altingiaceae, but was formerly considered a member of the Hamamelidaceae.

== Names ==
This plant's genus name Liquidambar was first given by Linnaeus in 1753 from the Latin liquidus ('fluid') and the Arabic ambar ('amber'), in allusion to the fragrant terebinthine juice or gum which exudes from the tree. Its specific epithet styraciflua is an old generic name meaning 'flowing with storax' (a plant resin). The name "storax" has long been confusingly applied to the aromatic gum or resin of this species, that of L. orientalis of Turkey, and to the resin better known as benzoin from various tropical trees in the genus Styrax.

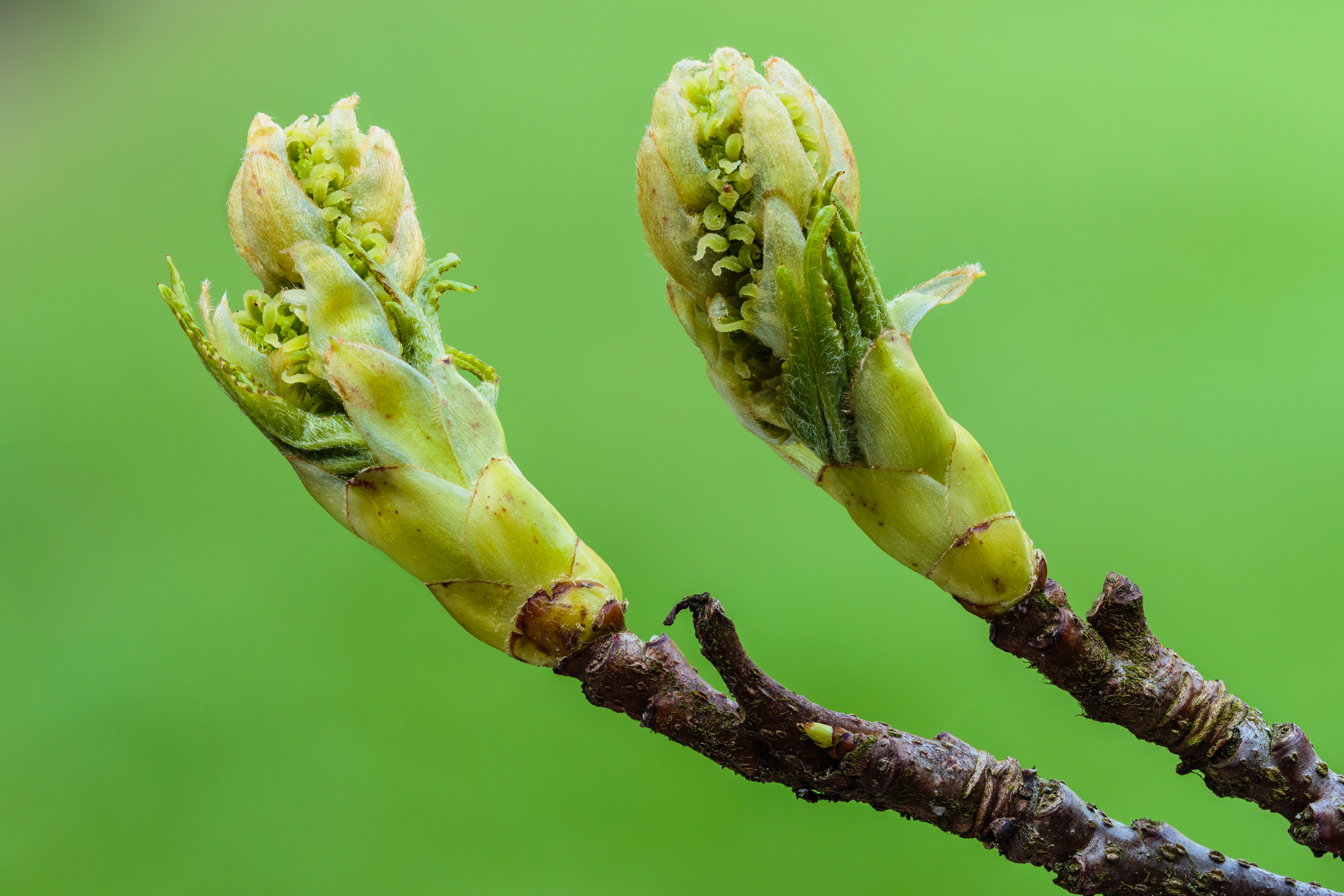
Developing leaves and flower buds of a Sweetgum (Liquidambar styraciflua).

The sweetgum has a Nahuatl name, Ocotzocuahuitl, which translates to 'tree that gives pine resin' from ocotl ('pine'), tzotl ('resin'), cuahuitl ('tree'), which refers to the use of the tree's resin.

The common name "sweetgum" refers to the species' "sweetish gum", contrasting with the blackgum (Nyssa sylvatica), only distantly related, with which the sweetgum overlaps broadly in range. The species is also known as the "redgum", for its reddish bark.

== History ==
The earliest known published record of L. styraciflua is in a work by Spanish naturalist Francisco Hernández published posthumously in 1615, in which he describes the species as a large tree producing a fragrant gum resembling liquid amber, whence the genus name Liquidambar. In John Ray's Historia Plantarum (1686) it is called Styrax liquida. However, the first mention of any use of the amber is described by Juan de Grijalva, the nephew of the governor of Cuba, in the year 1517. Juan de Grijalva tells of gift exchanges with the Mayas "who presented them with, among other things, hollow reeds of about a span long filled with dried herbs and sweet-smelling liquid amber which, when lighted in the way shown by the natives, diffused an agreeable odour." The species was introduced into Europe in 1681 by John Banister, the missionary collector sent out by Bishop Compton, who planted it in the palace gardens at Fulham in London, England.

=== Fossil record ===
An ancestor of Liquidambar styraciflua is known from Tertiary-aged fossils in Alaska, Greenland, and the mid-continental plateau of North America, much farther north than Liquidambar now grows. A similar plant is also found in Miocene deposits of the Tertiary of Europe.

== Description ==
=== Size ===
L. styraciflua is a medium-sized to large tree, growing anywhere from 15–20 m (50–70 ft) in cultivation and up to 45 m (150 ft) in the wild, with a trunk up 60–90 cm (2–3 ft) in diameter on average. Trees may live to 400 years. The tree is a symmetrical shape and crowns into an egg shape when the branches get too heavy after its first two years of cultivation.

=== Bark and branches ===
The bark attaches itself to these in plates edgewise instead of laterally, and a piece of the leafless branch with the aid of a little imagination readily takes on a reptilian form; indeed, the tree is sometimes called "alligatorwood". The bark is a light brown tinged with red and sometimes gray with dark streaks and has a density of 590 kg/m^{3} (37 lb/cu ft). It is deeply fissured with scaly ridges. The branches carry layers of cork. The branchlets are pithy, many-angled, winged, and at first covered with rusty hairs, finally becoming red brown, gray or dark brown. As an ornamental tree, the species has a drawback—the branches may have ridges or "wings" that cause more surface area, increasing weight of snow and ice accumulation on the tree. However, the wood is heavy and hard with an interlocking grain, but is difficult to season.

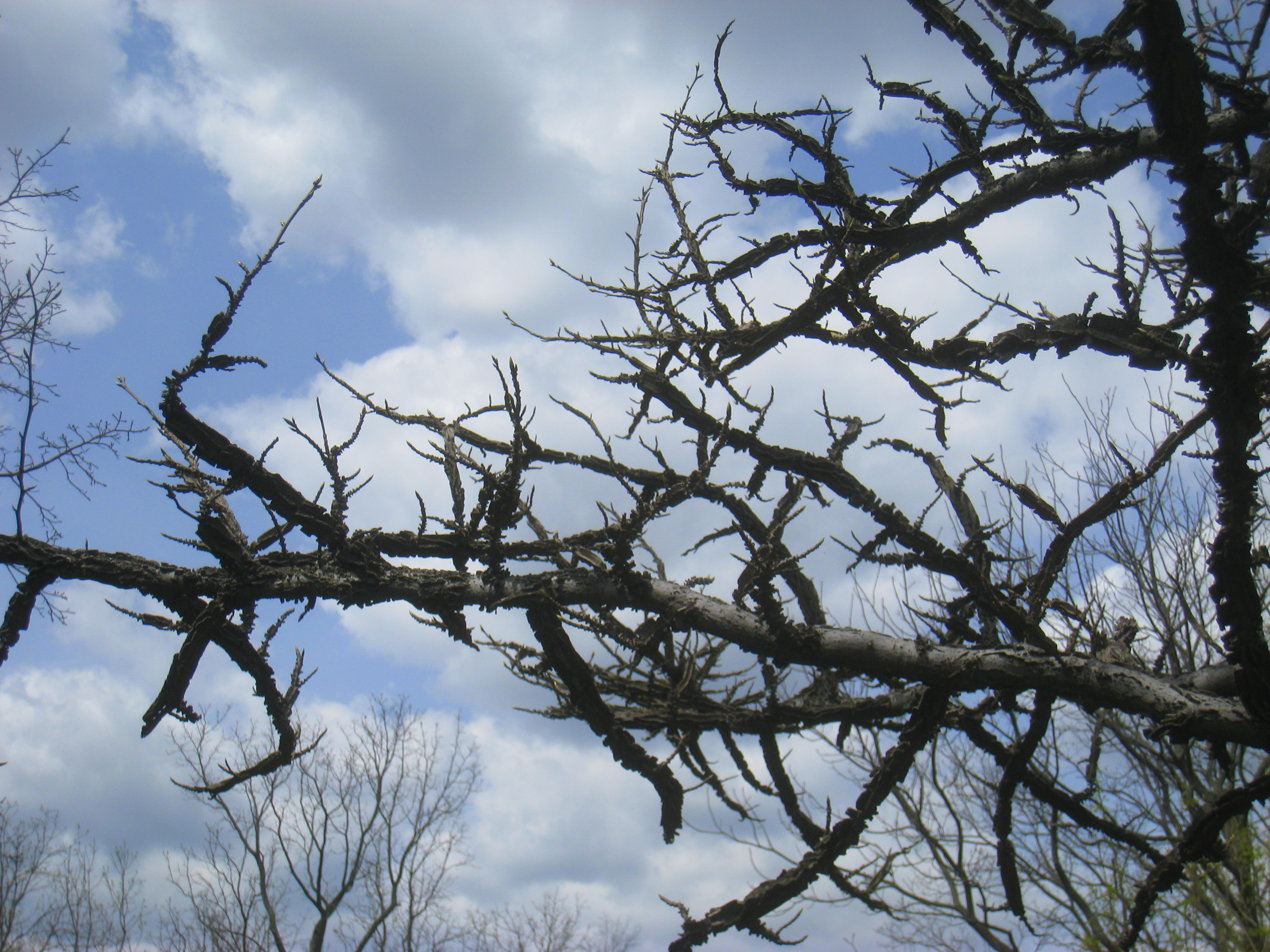
Small branches with edgewise plates of bark

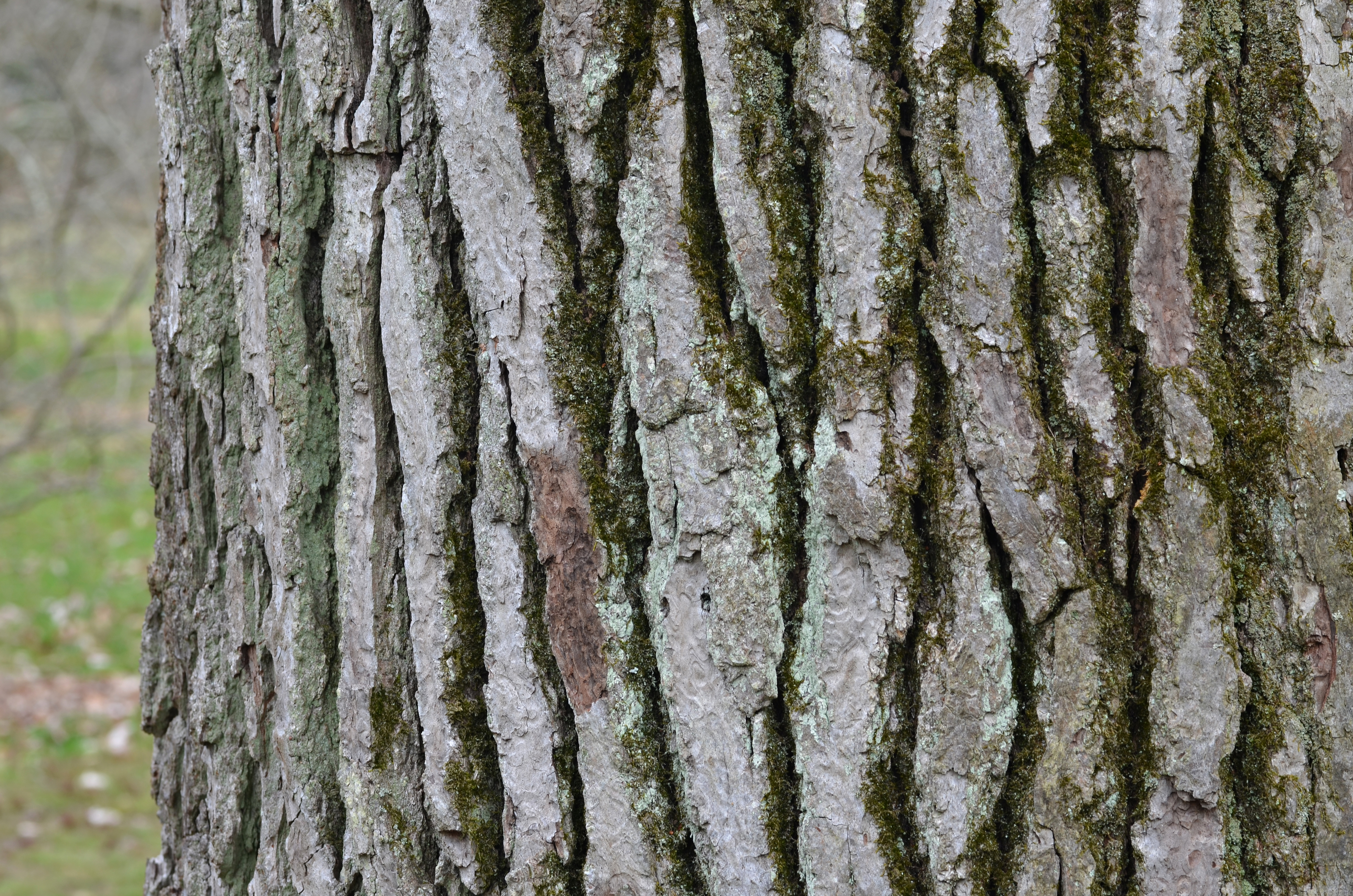
Deeply ridged bark

=== Leaves ===
L. styraciflua tree along the year

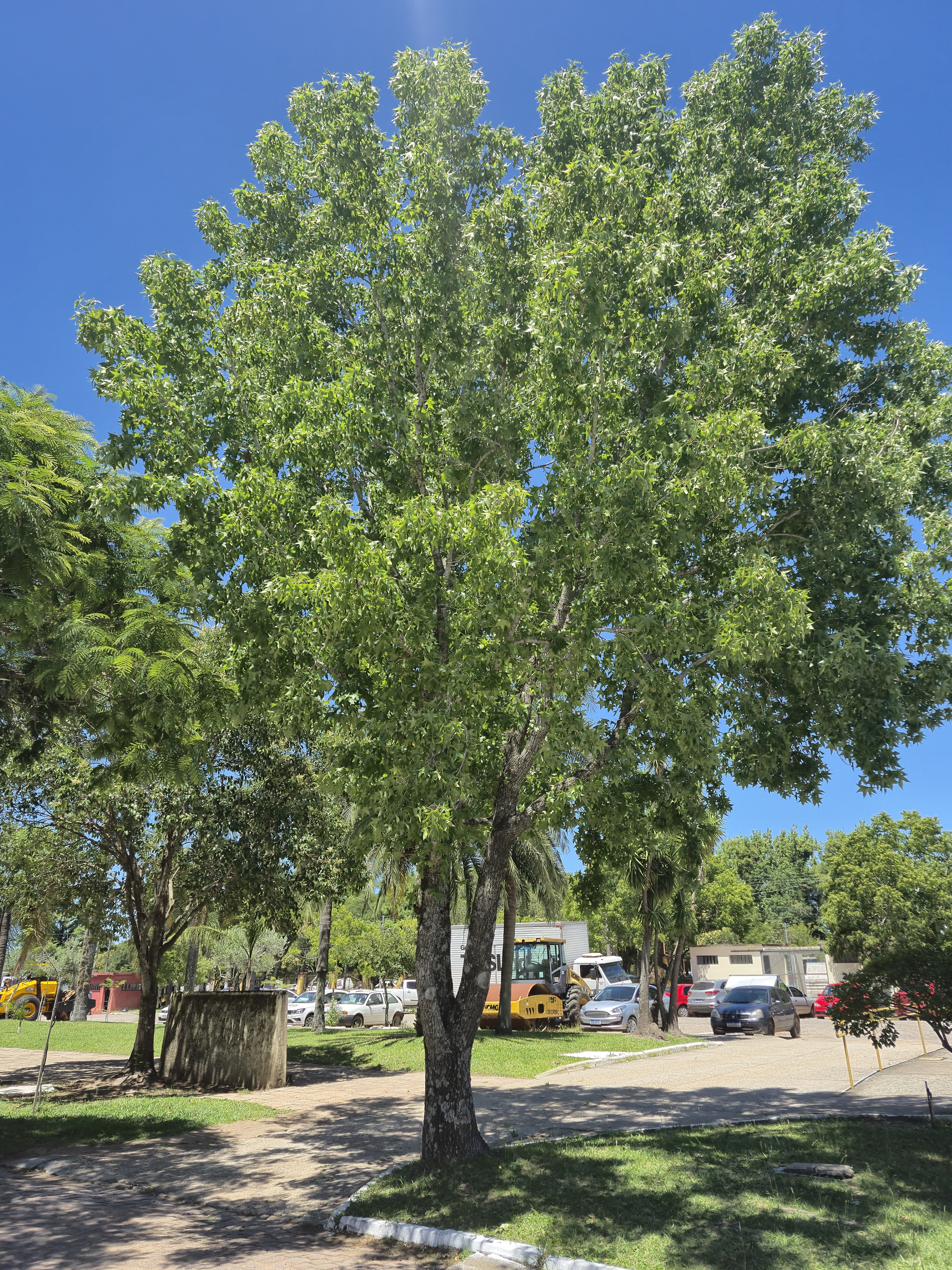
Tree in the summer

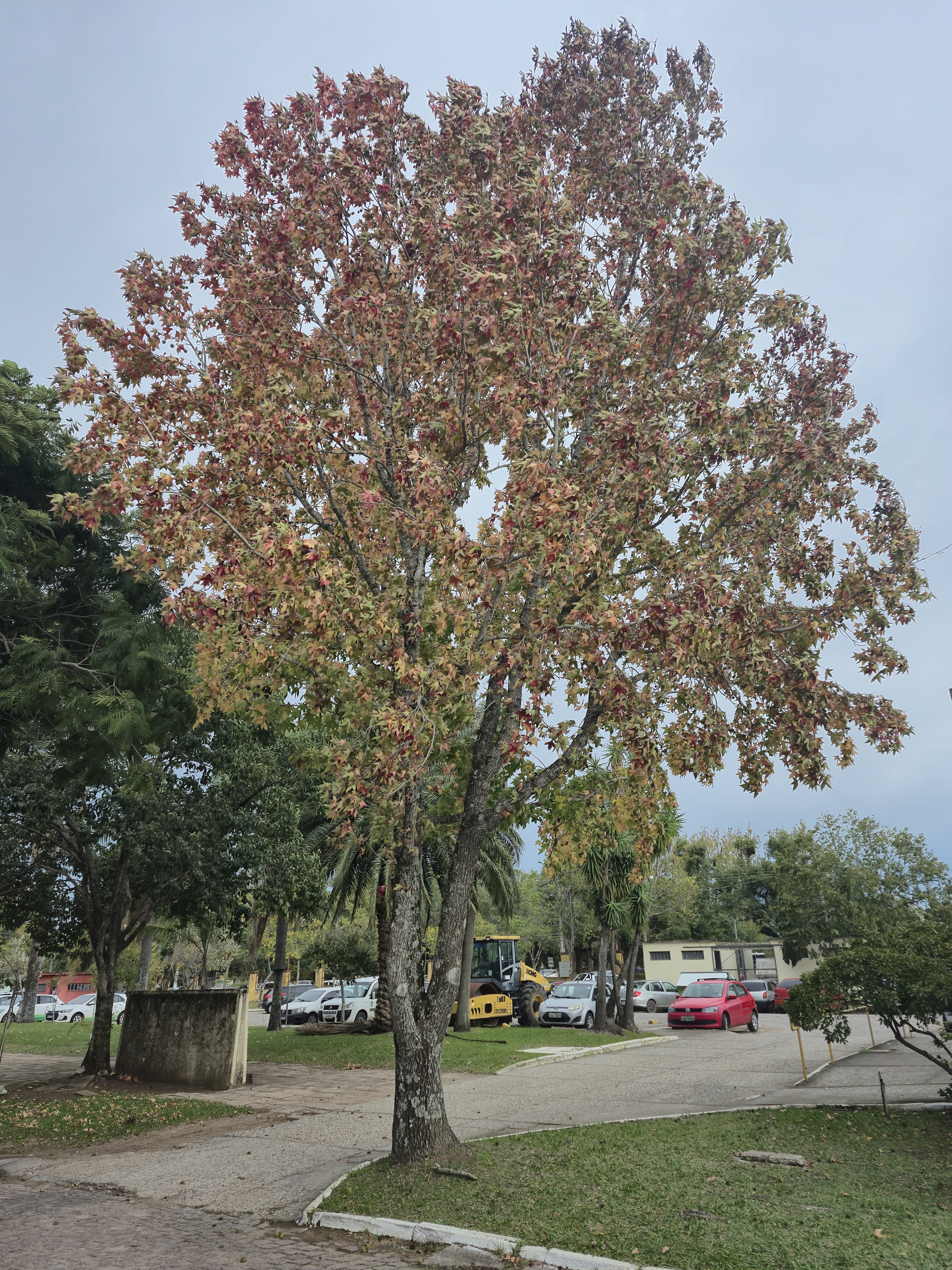
Tree in autumn, May 7th (Southern Hemisphere)

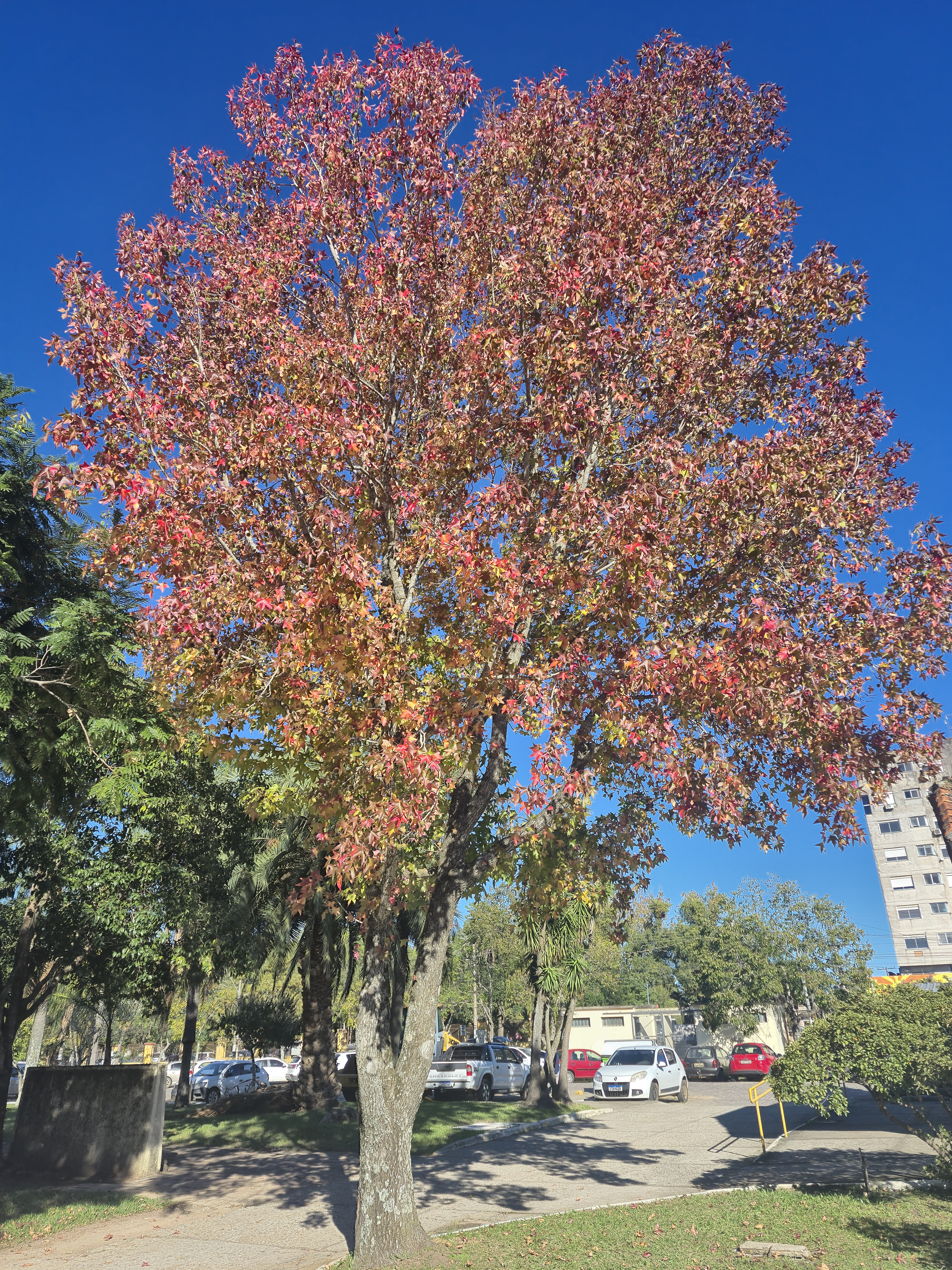
The same tree on May 12th

The leaves usually have five (but sometimes three or seven) sharply pointed palmate lobes. They are 8–13 cm (3–5 in) wide on average and have three distinct bundle scars.

They are long and broad, with a 6–10 cm (2 1/4–4 in) petiole. The rich dark green, smooth, shiny, star-shaped leaves generally turn brilliant yellow, orange, red, and purple colors in the autumn. Its reds and yellows compare to those of the maples (Acer), and in addition it has the dark purples and smoky browns of the ash (Fraxinus). However, in the northern part of its range, and where planted in colder areas, the leaves are often killed by frost while still green. On the other hand, in the extreme southern or tropical parts of its range, some trees are evergreen or semi-evergreen, with negligible fall color. The base is truncate or slightly heart-shaped. They contain tannin and when bruised give a resinous fragrance.

While the starry five-pointed leaves of Liquidambar resemble those of some maples (Acer), Liquidambar is easily distinguished from Acer by its glossy, leathery leaves that grow in an alternate pattern, and not in pairs on the stems. Luna and promethea moth caterpillars feed on the leaves.

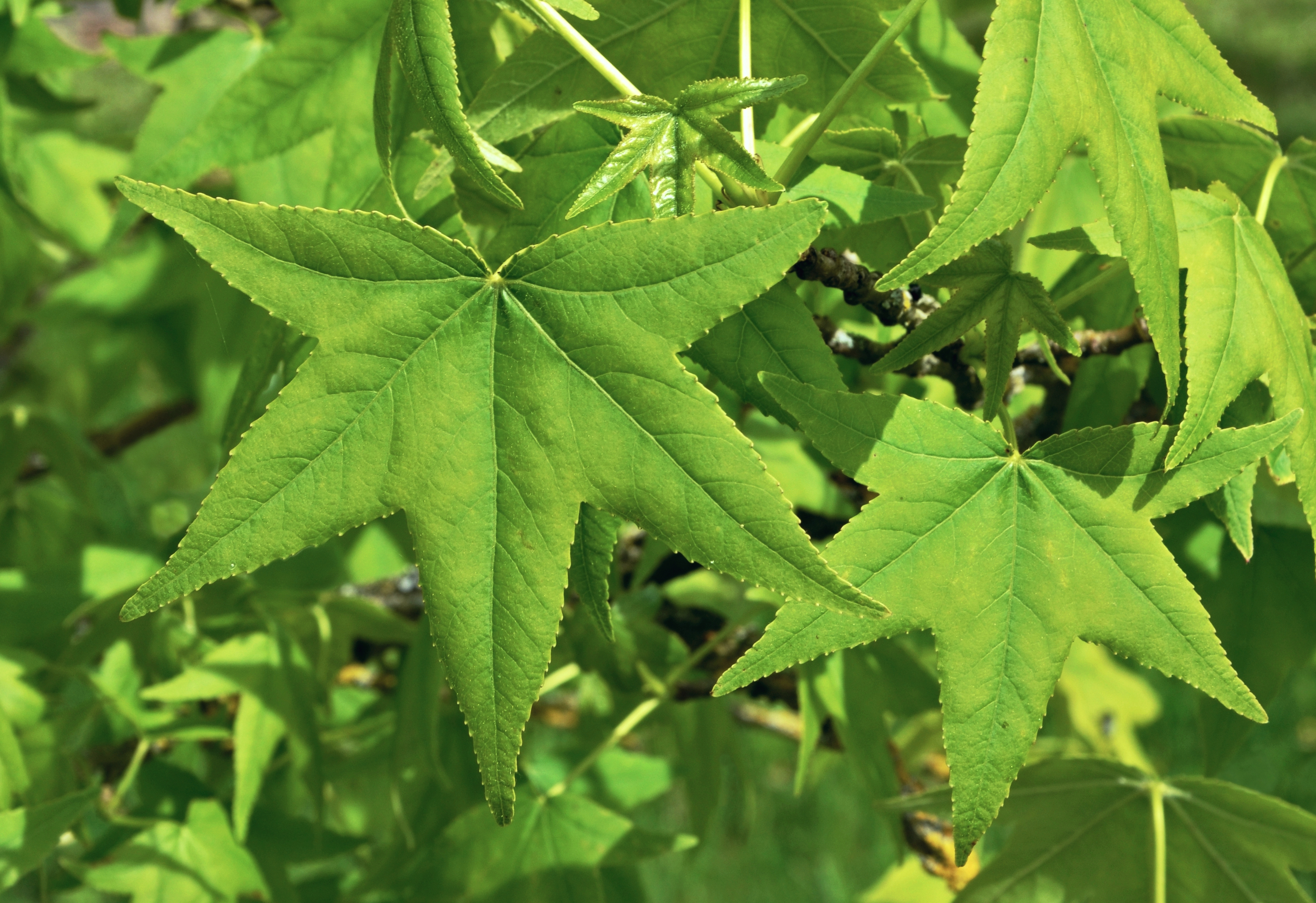
Summer foliage

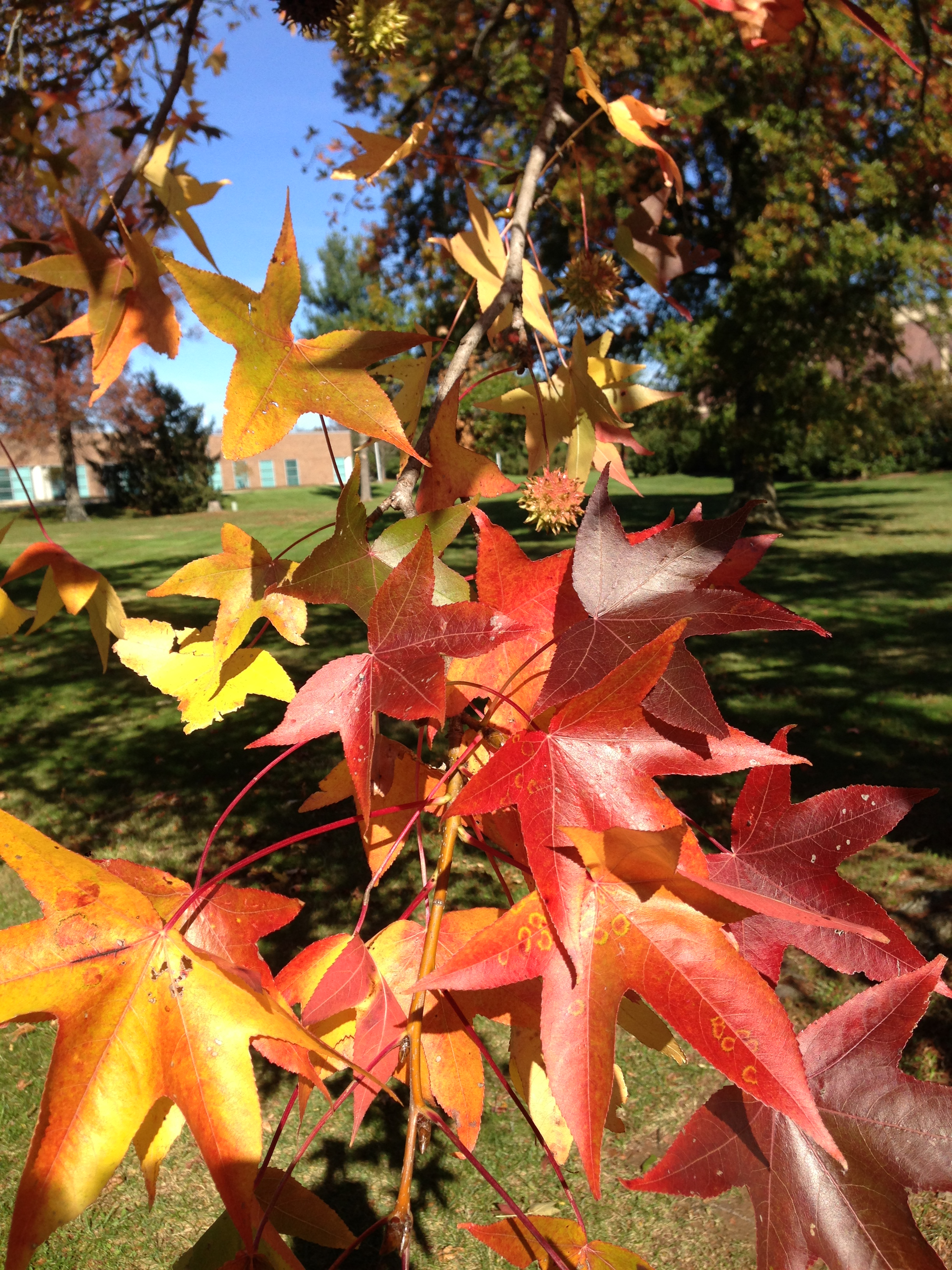
Autumn foliage

=== Flowers ===
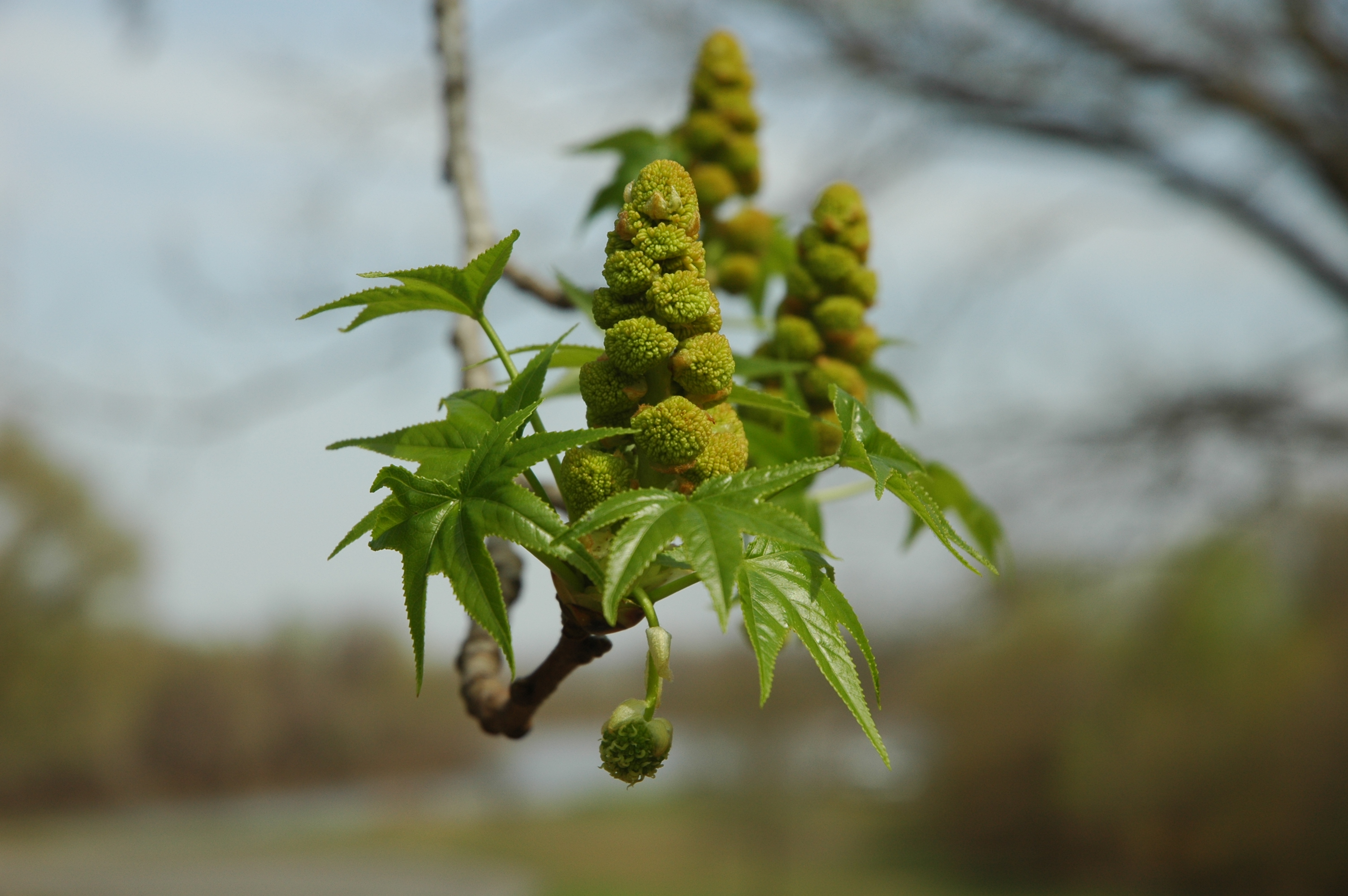
Flower of sweetgum

The flowers typically appear in spring and persist into autumn, with some persisting into winter. They are typically about 25–40 mm (1–1 1/2 in) in diameter and are covered with hairs. The flowers are unisexual and greenish in color. Staminate flowers in terminal racemes 5–8 cm (2–3 in) long, the pistillate in a solitary head on a slender peduncle borne in the axil of an upper leaf. Staminate flowers destitute of calyx and corolla, but are surrounded by hairy bracts. Stamens indefinite; filaments short; anthers introrse. Pistillate flowers with a two-celled, two-beaked ovary, the carpels produced into a long, recurved, persistent style. The ovaries all more or less cohere and harden in fruit. There are many ovules but few mature.

=== Fruit ===
The distinctive compound fruit is hard, dry, and globose, 25–40 mm (1–1 1/2 in) in diameter, composed of numerous (40–60) capsules. Each capsule, containing one to two small seeds, has a pair of terminal spikes (for a total of 80–120 spikes). When the fruit opens and the seeds are released, each capsule is associated with a small hole (40–60 of these) in the compound fruit.

Fallen, opened fruits are often abundant beneath the trees; these have been popularly nicknamed "burr (or bir) balls", "gum balls", "space bugs", "sticker balls", "spike balls", or "monkey balls".

The fruit is a multicapsular spherical head and hangs on the branches during the winter. The woody capsules are mostly filled with abortive seeds resembling sawdust. The seeds are about 6 mm (1/4 in) thick, winged, and wind-dispersed. Goldfinches, purple finches, squirrels, and chipmunks eat the seeds of the tree. The seeds stratify within 30–90 days at 1–5 °C (33–41 °F) or soaked in water for 15–20 days. The long-stemmed fruit balls of Liquidambar resemble those of the American sycamore or buttonwood (Platanus occidentalis), but are spiny and remain intact after their seeds are dispersed; the softer fruits of Platanus disintegrate upon seed dispersal. The long-persisting fallen spiked fruits can be unpleasant to walk on; sweet gum is banned in some places for this reason. In abundance, they can leave a lawn lumpy. The winter buds are yellow brown, 6 mm (1/4 in) long, acute. The inner scales enlarge with the growing shoot, becoming 13 mm (1/2 in) long, green tipped with red.

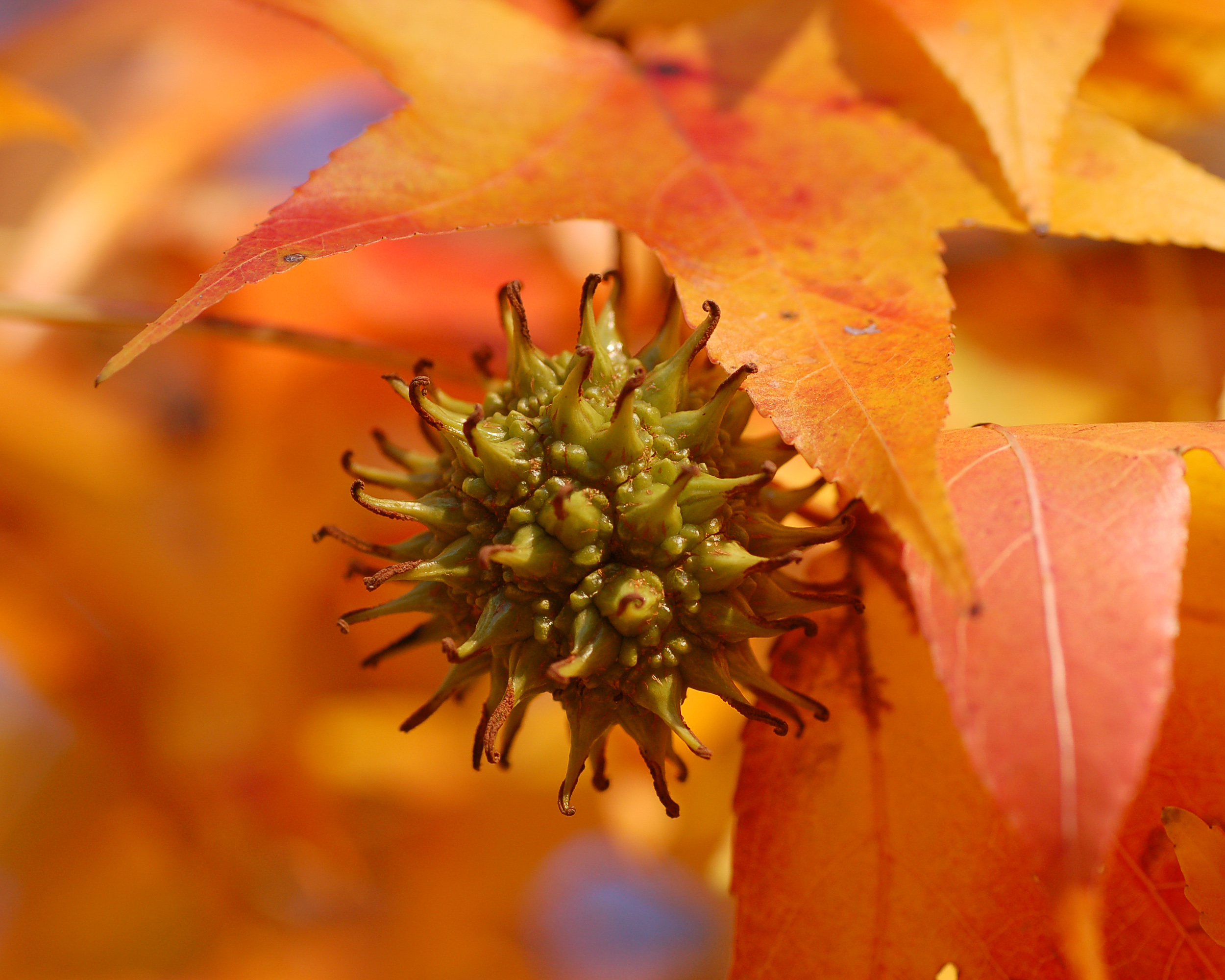
Green fruit

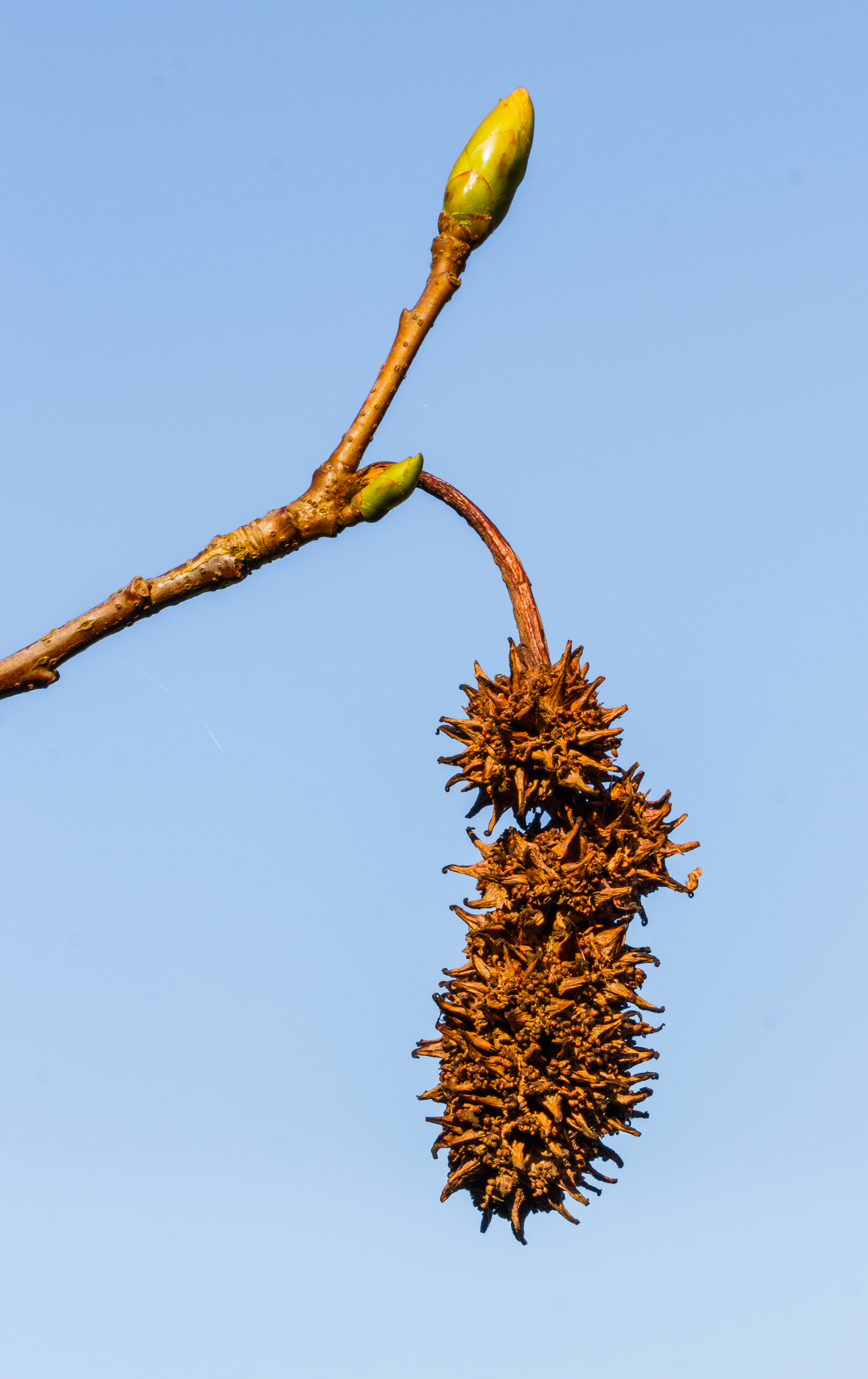
Leaf buds and fruit

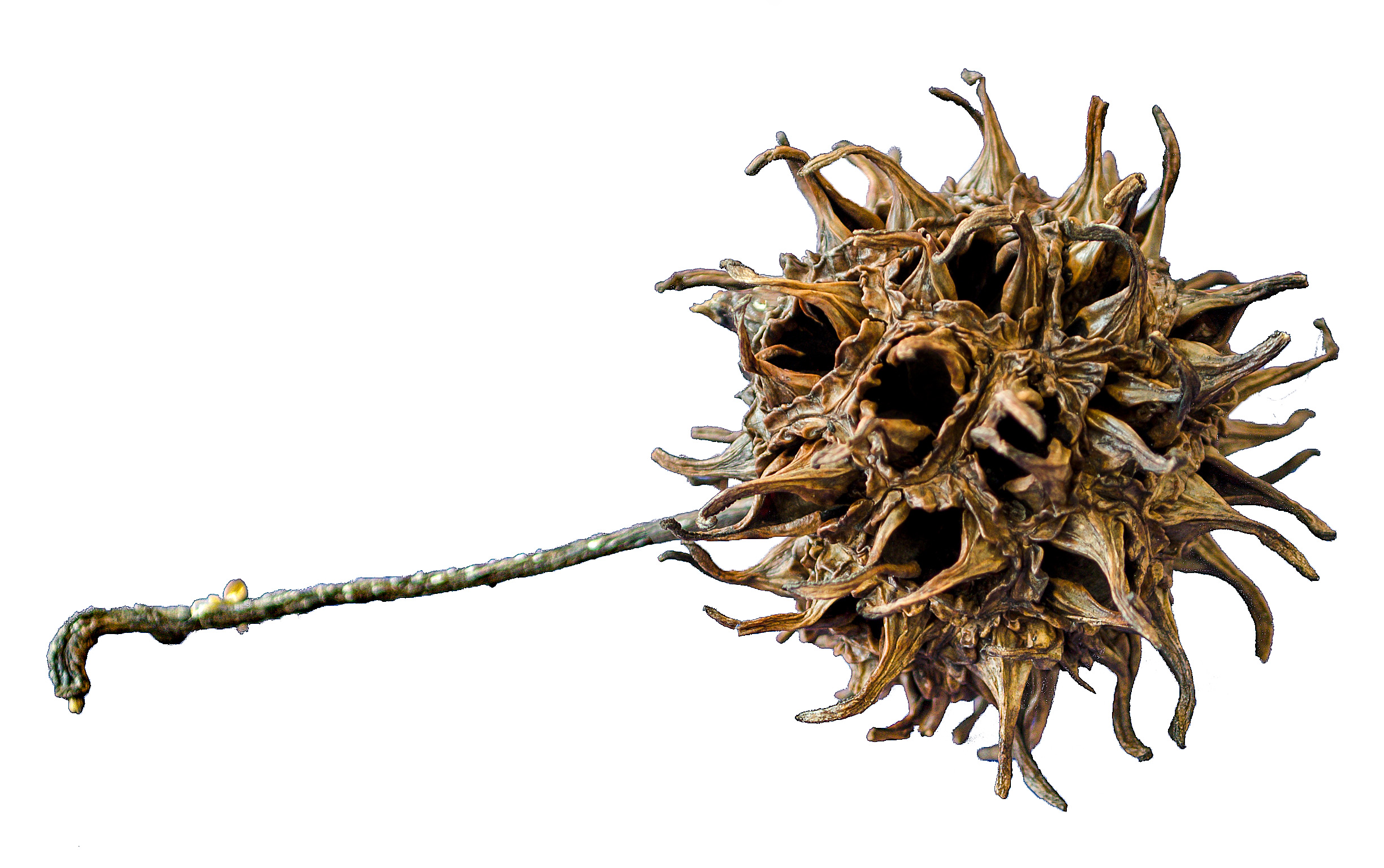
American sweetgum tree ball (spiny seed pod)

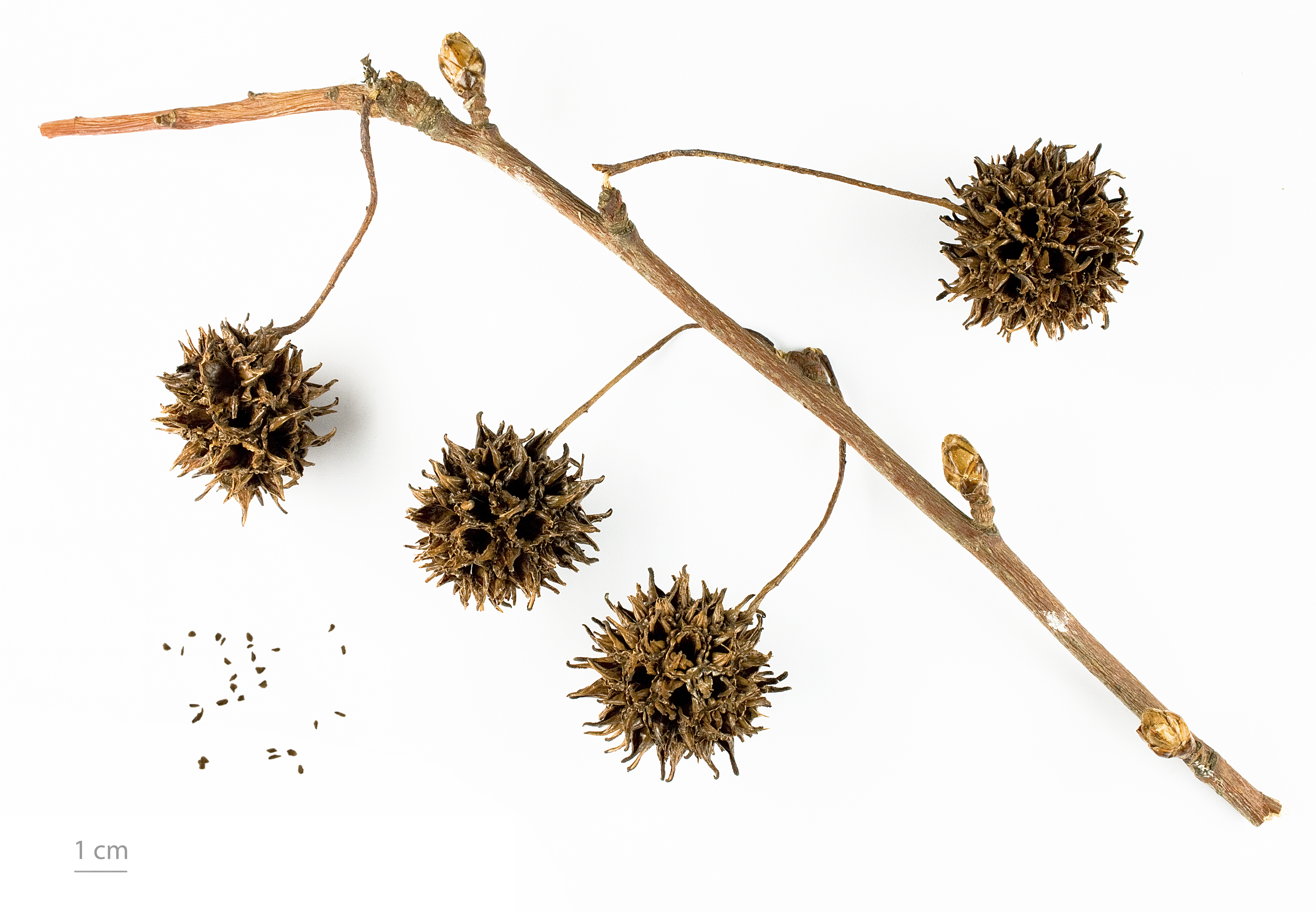
Mature fruit and seed

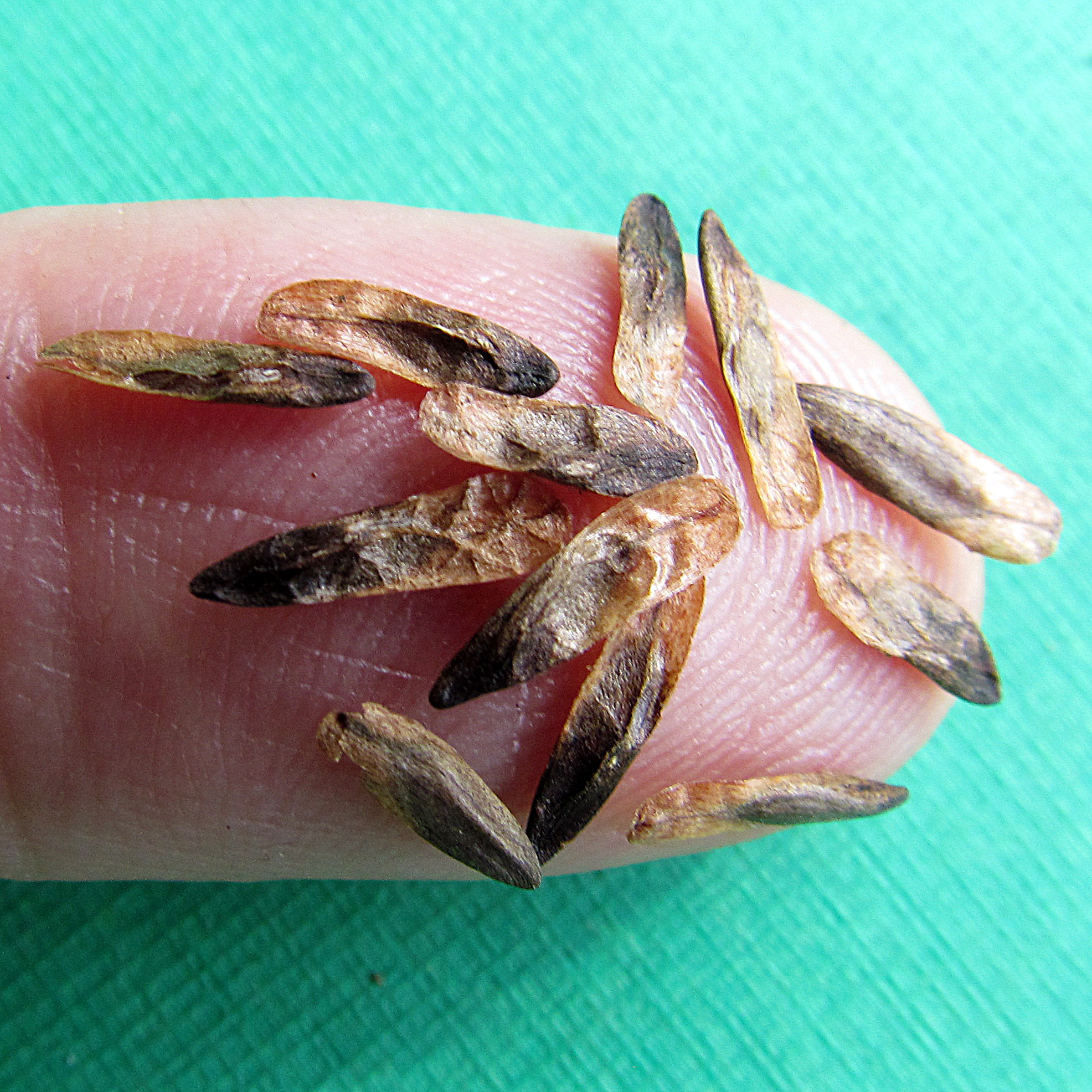
Winged seeds

== Distribution ==
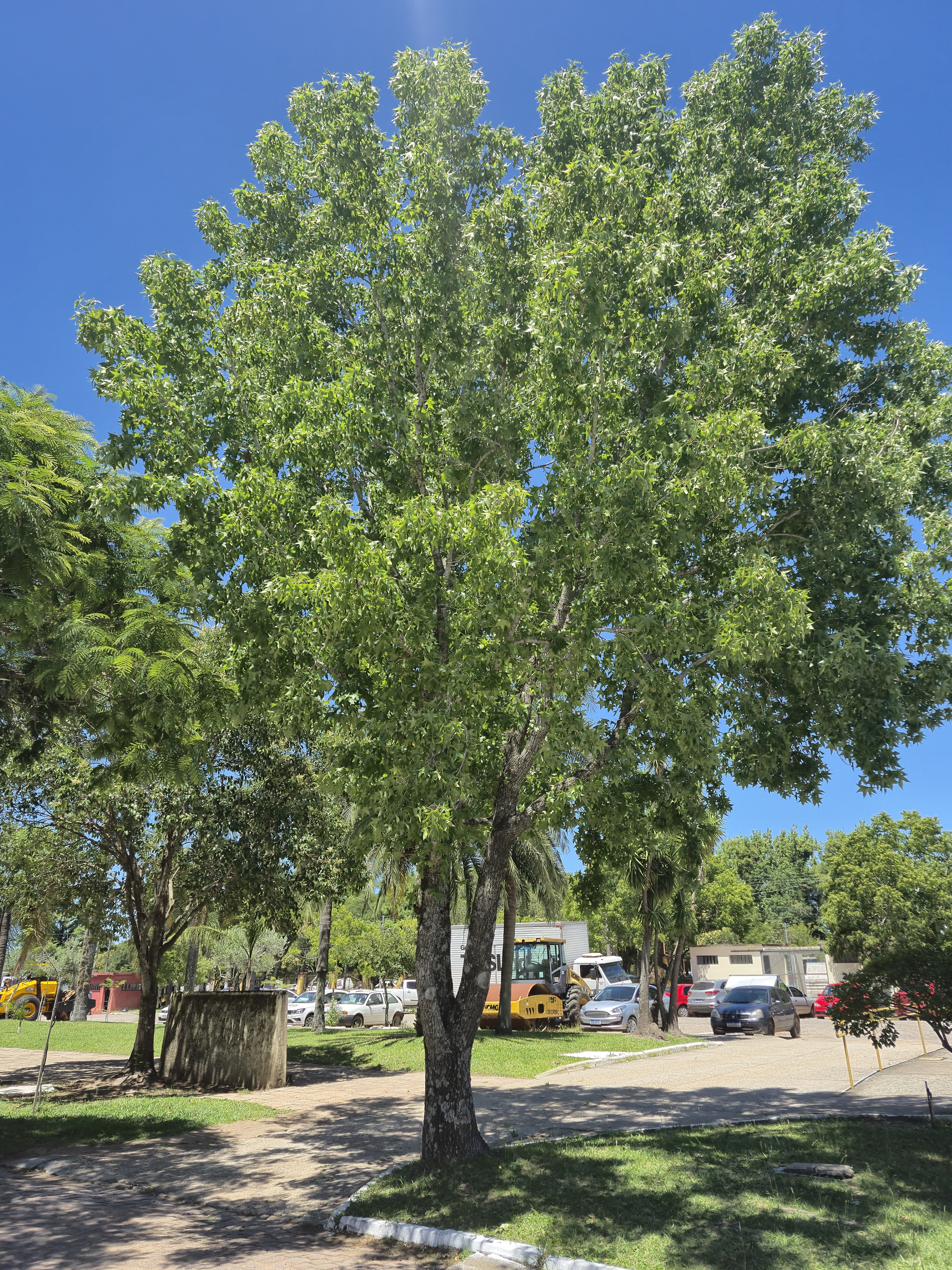
Tree in Brazil

Sweetgum is one of the most common hardwoods in the southeastern and Mid-Atlantic United States, where it occurs naturally in lowlands from southwestern Connecticut south to central Florida, through central Ohio and west to Illinois, southern Missouri, and eastern Texas, but not colder highland areas of Appalachia or the Midwestern states. The species also occurs in Mexico from southern Nuevo León south to Chiapas, as well as in Guatemala, El Salvador, Belize, Nicaragua and Honduras. In Mexico and Central America, it is a characteristic plant of cloud forests, growing at middle elevations in various mountainous areas where the climate is humid and more temperate.

The US government distribution maps for this species are incorrect concerning the southern limit of distribution in Florida. This species occurs abundantly at Highlands Hammock State Park in Sebring, Highlands County, Florida, and even southwest of Lake Okeechobee.

== Uses ==
=== Wood ===
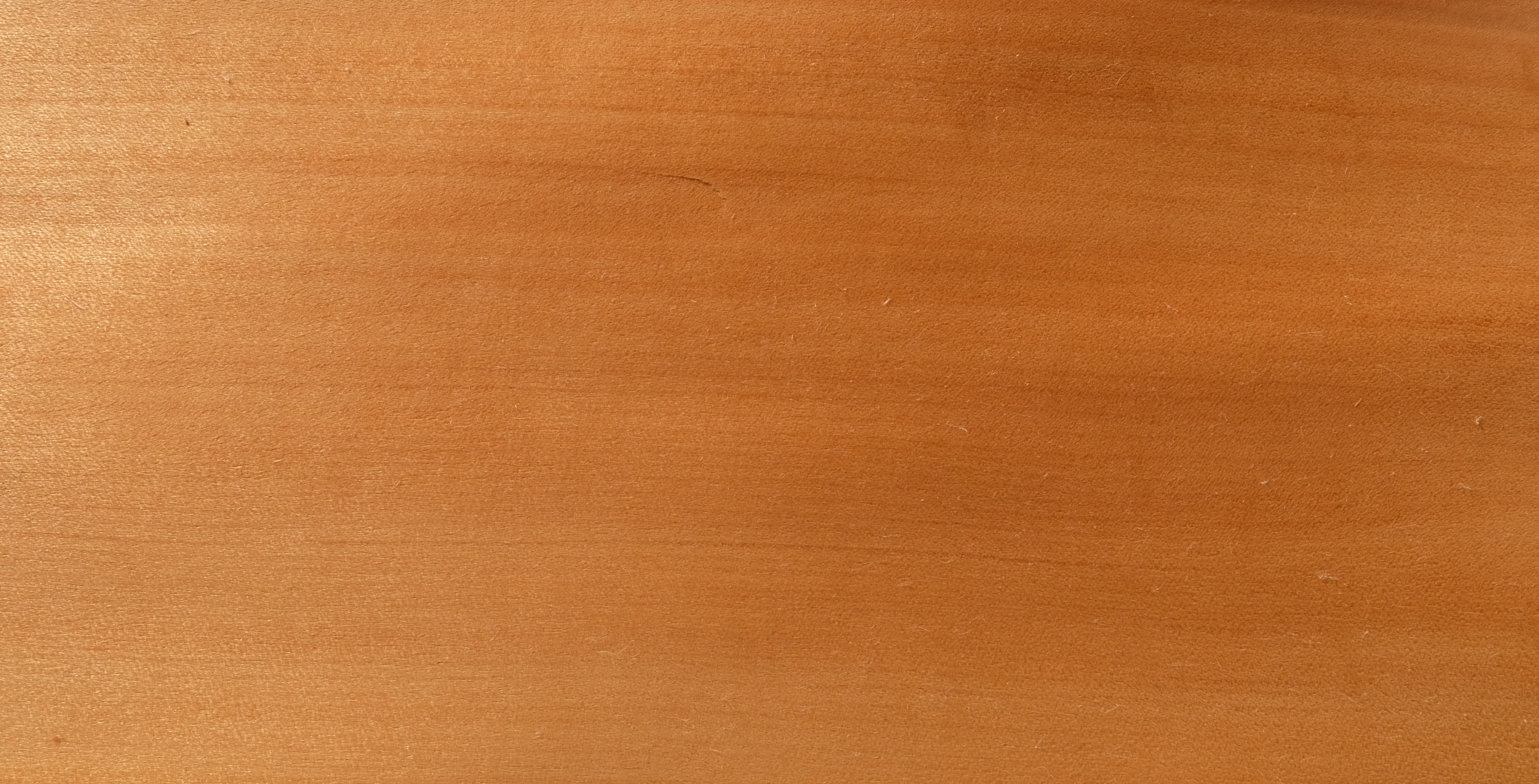
Lumber

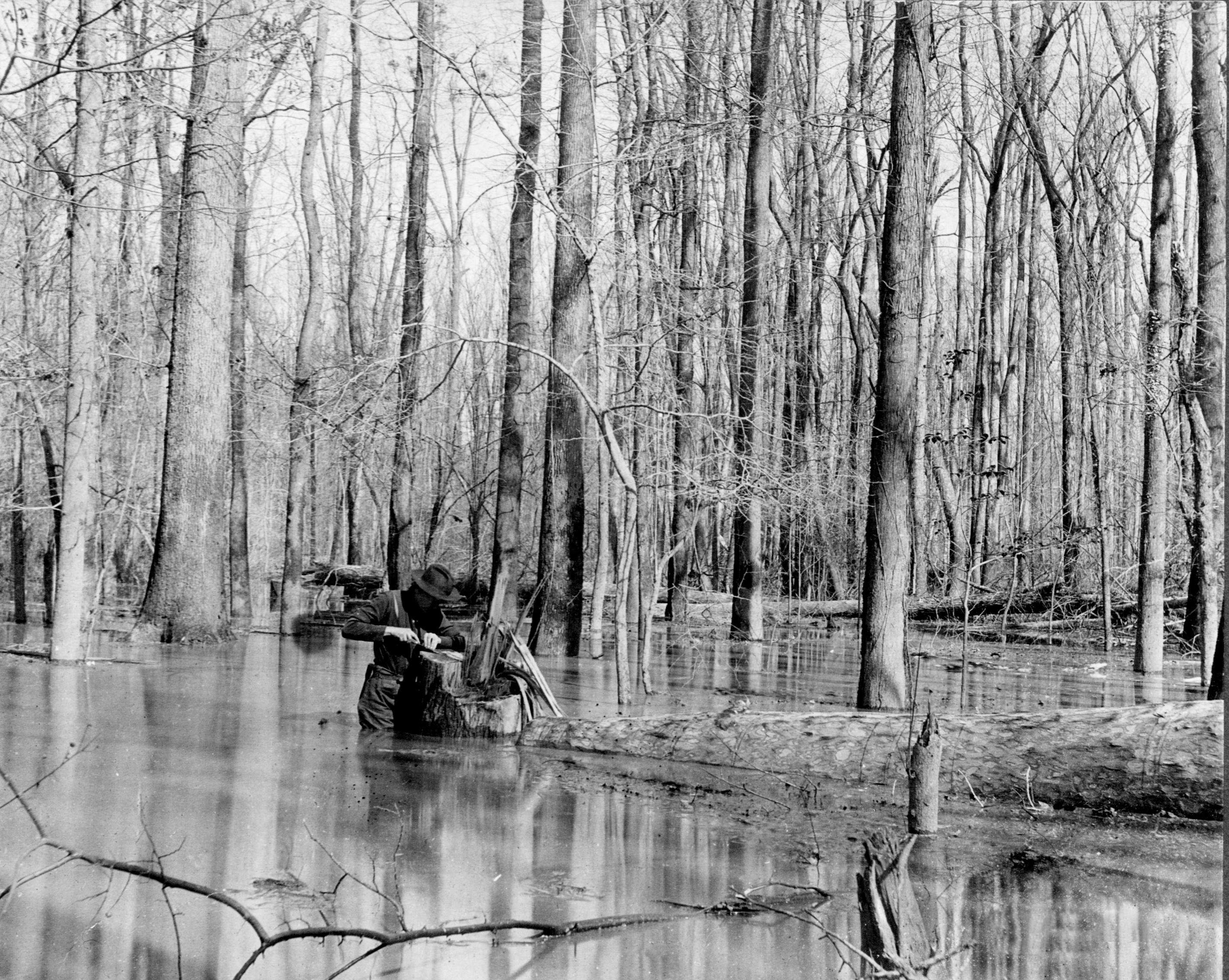
Harvesting redgum in Richland County, South Carolina, 1904

Sweetgum (Liquidambar styraciflua) is one of the most important commercial hardwoods in the Southeastern United States. Its wood is bright reddish brown (with the sapwood nearly white) and may have black grain in the heartwood; it is heavy, straight, satiny, and close-grained, but not strong. It takes a beautiful polish, but warps badly in drying. The wood has a specific gravity of 0.5910. It is too liable to decay for outdoor use.

In the carpentry industry, the timber is referred to as satin walnut and is one of the most important materials for plywood manufacturers. It is used for furniture, interior trim, railroad ties, cigar boxes, crates, flooring, barrels, woodenware, and wood pulp. It is also used for veneer for plywood. The wood is very compact and fine-grained, the heartwood being reddish, and, when cut into planks, marked transversely with blackish belts. Sweetgum is used principally for lumber, veneer, plywood, slack cooperage, fuel, and pulpwood. The lumber is made into boxes and crates, furniture, cabinets for radios, televisions, and phonographs, interior trim, and millwork. The veneer and plywood, (typically backed with some other kind of wood which shrinks and warps less) are used for boxes, pallets, crates, baskets, and interior woodwork. It was formerly used in the interior finish of railroad sleeping cars. Being readily dyed black, it is sometimes substituted for ebony for such uses as inexpensive picture frames. The wood is also used to make chopsticks for the East Asian market, as it has a naturally light color with appeal to certain segments of the Asian market.

=== Resin ===
The tree's gum resin, for which the tree is named, exudes from the bark of the tree when wounded. It has many names, including liquid amber or copalm balsam. It is a kind of native balsam, or resin, resembling turpentine. It may be clear, reddish, or yellow, with a pleasant smell like ambergris. As the resin ages, it solidifies, the form in which it was historically exported in barrels. The resin is produced by stripping, boiling, and pressing the tree's bark. The gum was used both medicinally and to make chewing gum.

=== Shikimic acid ===
L. styraciflua seeds may be a renewable source of shikimic acid.

=== Medicinal ===
Traditionally, sweet gum has been used in Chinese medicine to treat issues such as diarrhea, coughs, and skin sores.

== Cultivation ==
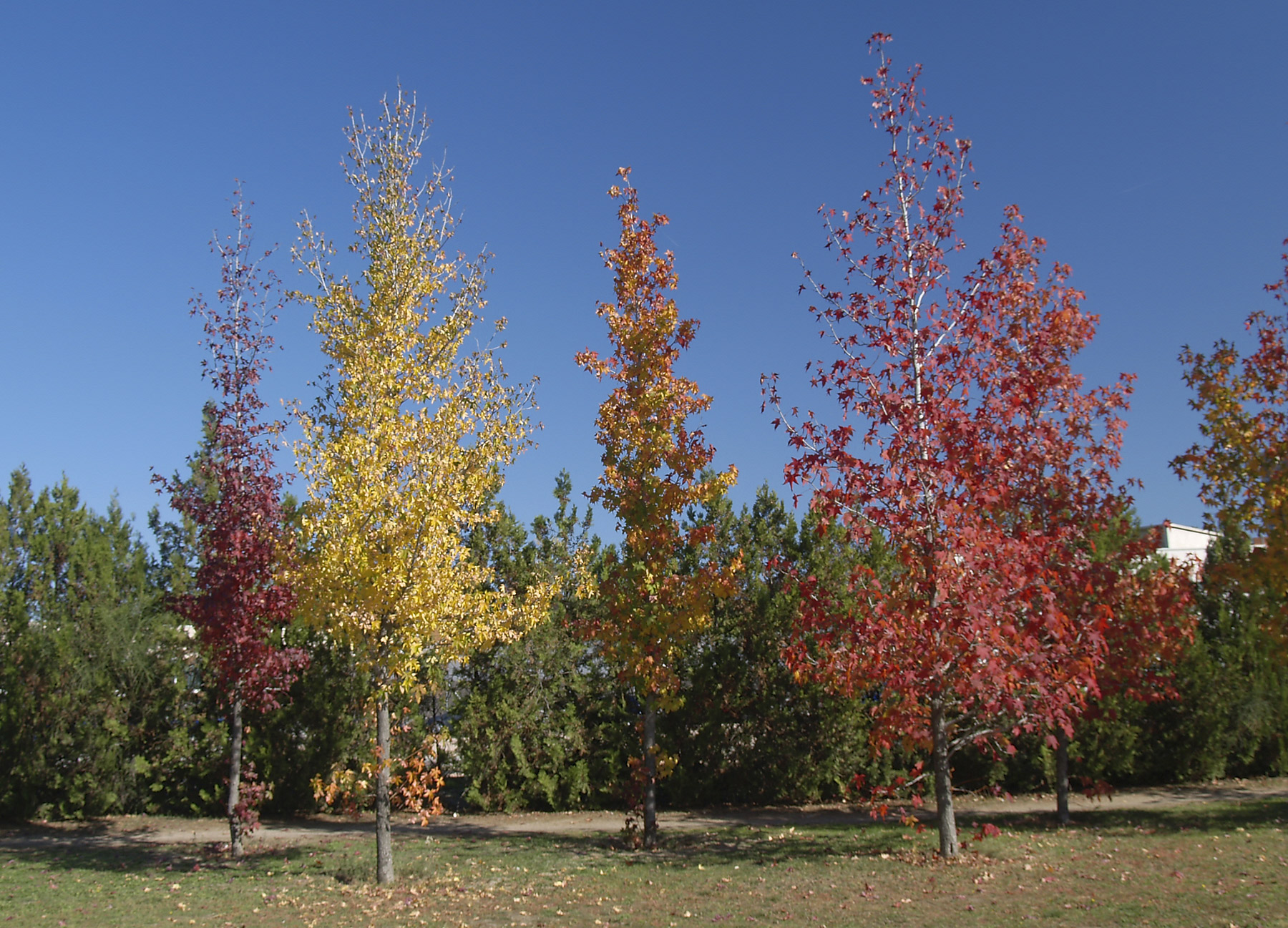
A group of young sweetgum in autumn

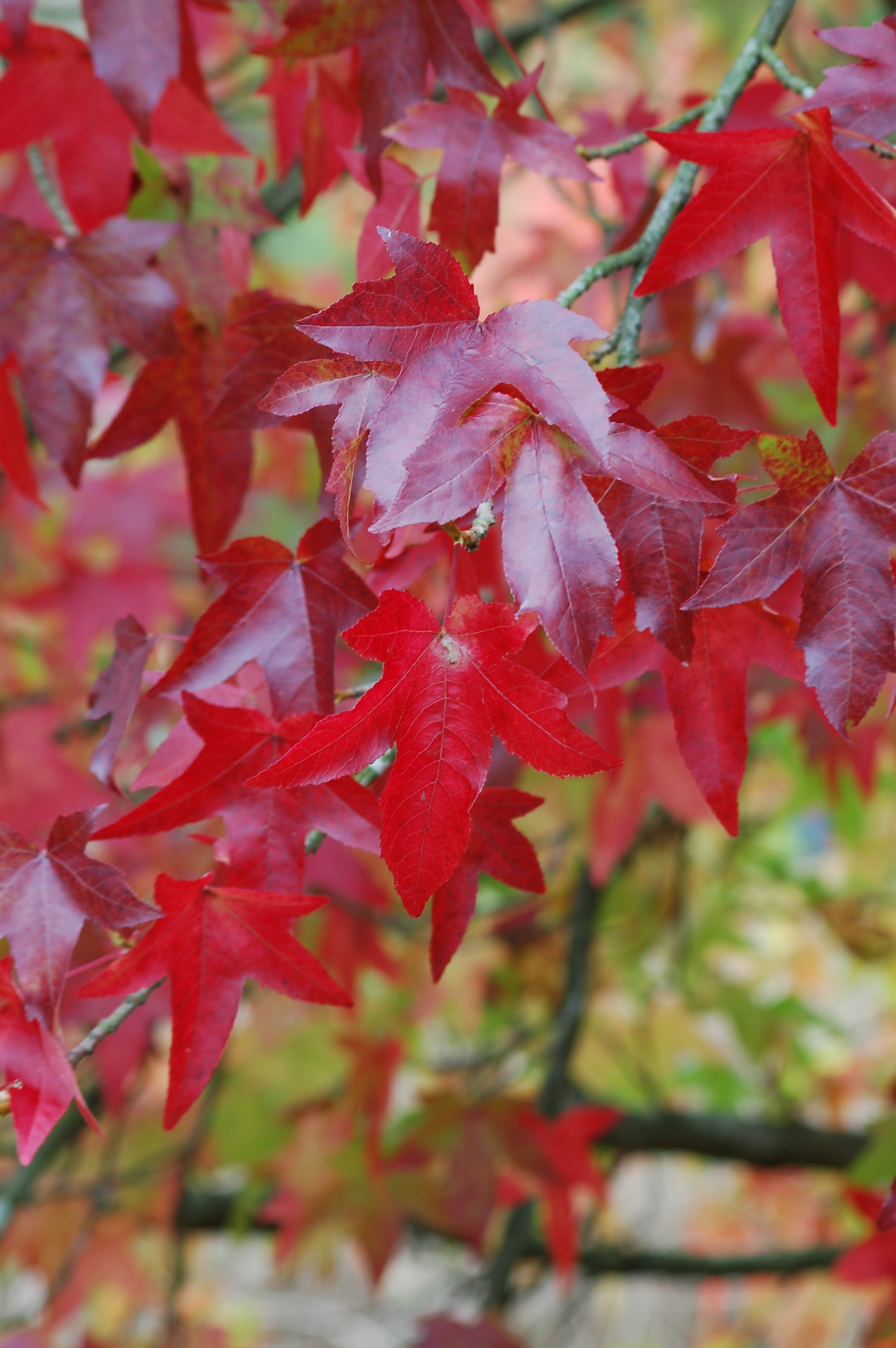

Liquidambar styraciflua is a popular ornamental and forestal tree, cultivated for its distinctive foliage and intense autumn colors. It is commonly grown throughout its native North American range as well as many other temperate parts of the world, including moderately high elevations in the tropics. It is highly regarded in Bogotá, Colombia. The species grows best in moist, acidic loam or clay soil, and tolerates poor drainage. It typically grows with other coastal plain species such as willow oak and sweetbay magnolia. Its salt tolerance is moderate. Chlorosis can develop on alkaline soil, especially where organic matter is low. Also, the American sweetgum tree does not grow well in shady areas. Grown as an ornamental tree in Australia, Liquidambar styraciflua has a distribution on mainland Australia from southwestern Western Australia, southern South Australia, New South Wales, Victoria, and all the way up to the Atherton Tablelands in far North Queensland.

During the late 1970s and throughout the 1980s, Sweetgums were a popular landscaping and street tree. Three varieties, Palo Alto, Festival, and Burgundy, introduced in the late 1950s by the Saratoga Horticultural Foundation in Palo Alto, California became popular in the urban landscapes of California because of their pleasing appearance, striking fall colors, and ability to grow quickly and thrive; however, as the trees matured, the damage caused by surface roots and the increased production of seed balls led to the tree being considered a nuisance and a liability. Thousands of trees would be removed and repairs had to be conducted on nearby structures damaged by roots. The Western Arborist published a study that concluded that Sweetgums accounted for the greatest number of trees causing damage; in the city of Alameda alone it was found that 69% of Liquidambars planted in the city were either damaging or beginning to damage nearby structures. It is now recommended that the trees be planted at least 15 to 20 feet from structures and that they should not be used as street trees.

Among the many cultivars of Liquidambar styraciflua are (those marked agm have gained the Royal Horticultural Society's Award of Garden Merit):

- 'Burgundy' – dark red to purple fall colors may persist through winter
- 'Clydesform' – columnar or narrowly pyramidal; slow growth to 9 meters; yellow-orange fall colors; also sold as 'Emerald Sentinel'
- 'Festival' – columnar; pale green summer leaves; bright fall hues of yellow, pink and red; less hardy than most
- 'Firehouse' - pyramidal; bright red fall color; defoliates early; little to no seed production
- 'Goduzam' – variegated; pink to red-purple in autumn; also called 'Gold Dust'
- 'Grazam' – pyramidal, with glossy leaves. Orange, red and purple fall colors
- 'Gumball' – dwarf shrubby cultivar seldom more than 2 m (6 1/2 ft) tall, with purple-red fall color
- 'Lane Roberts' (agm)
- 'Moraine' – upright, rounded form, fast growth, red fall color, hardy to −30 °C
- 'Palo Alto' – various shades of red in fall; best in California
- 'Parasol' – develops rounded crown; mature height 10 meters; deep red fall color
- 'Penwood' (agm)
- 'Rotundiloba' – sterile cultivar with rounded lobes on leaves, originally discovered in North Carolina in the 1930s
- 'Slender Silhouette' – very narrow columnar form
- 'Worplesdon' (agm) – cutleaf cultivar with orange, red and purple fall colors

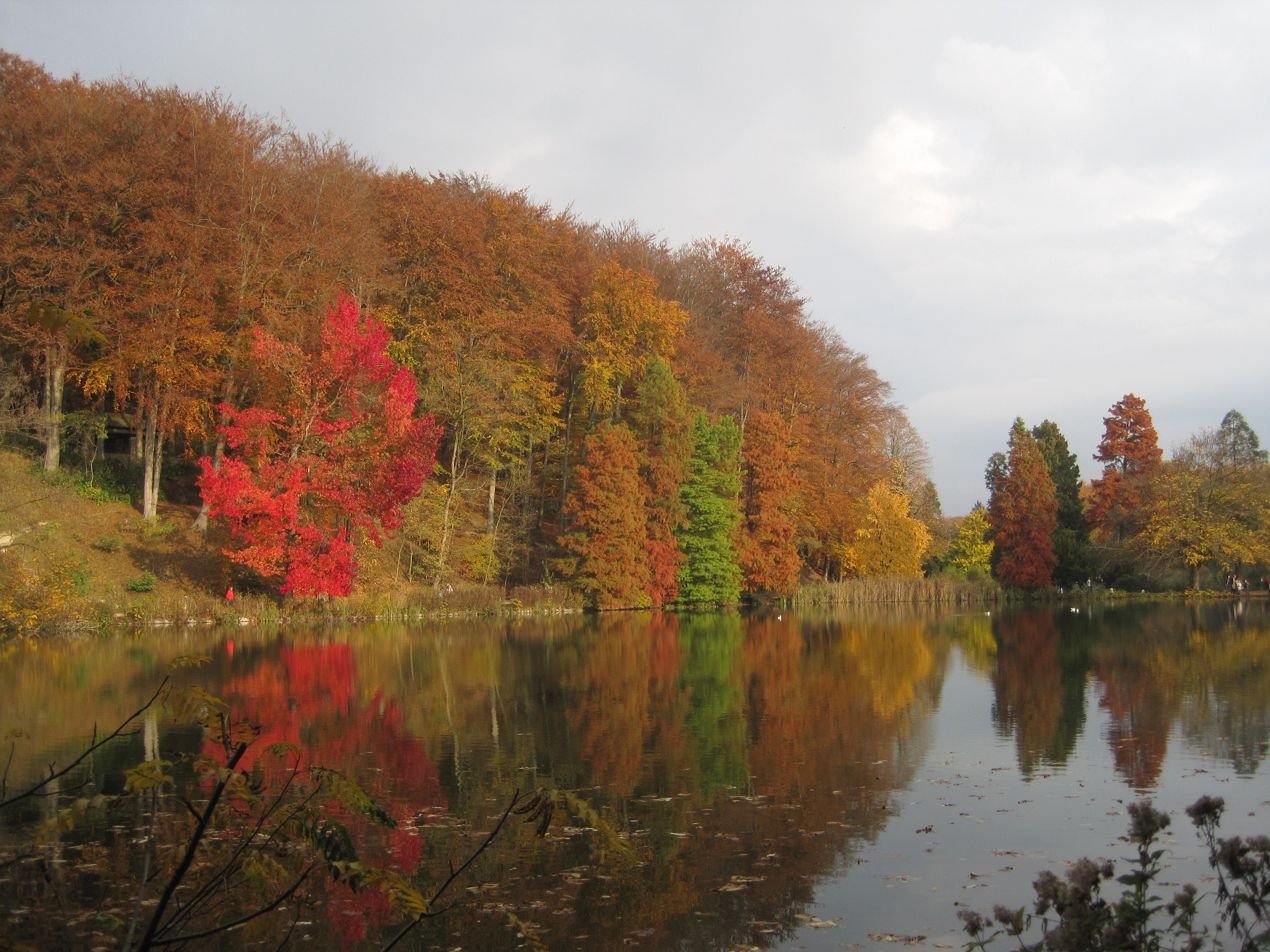
Sweetgum (red) in a natural park

The organizers of the September 11th Memorial in New York donated a grove of sweetgum trees to the Flight 93 Memorial in Shanksville, Pennsylvania.

=== Infection on Liquidambar styraciflua ===
The imperfect fungus Dicarpella dryina Sutton is a leaf parasite reported to occur on a wide range of host plants, including species of sweetgum (Liquidambar styraciflua L.). Limber and Cash reported that leaf spots produced by this pathogen on several different genera of forest trees were 2–5 mm diameter with regular margins. During the summer of 1994 in the Nacogdoches County area of Texas, a prominent leaf spot on sweetgum was widespread. Infected leaves had numerous necrotic lesions, each surrounded by a reddish halo. The lesions tended to merge resulting in large areas of dead tissue. Infection and fungal development of D. dryina were investigated on leaves of sweetgum using a combination of microscopic techniques. D. dryina infection on sweetgum has been associated with the disease red leaf spot. Results of this investigation indicate that D. dryina can penetrate leaf tissue directly, thus having the ability to initiate infection on both upper and lower leaf surfaces. In other regions of the U.S., sweetgum populations may not be as susceptible to local populations of this fungus.

Environmental stress factors may also be involved, as reports have indicated that herbicide application and chlorosis caused by iron deficiency may increase susceptibility of D. dryina. Tannins (a type of biomolecule found in trees to protect it from fire, insects, and bacteria) have been reported to occur in healthy tissue of a variety of plants including sweetgum. They may prevent pathogen invasion by inhibiting fungal enzyme activity. Although cells of healthy sweetgum tissue appear rich in tannins, these materials apparently were not effective in preventing fungal colonization by D. dryina.

== Bibliography ==
- Kormanik, Paul P. (1990). "Liquidambar styraciflua". In Burns, Russell M.; Honkala, Barbara H. (eds.). Hardwoods. Silvics of North America. Vol. 2. Washington, D.C.: United States Forest Service (USFS), United States Department of Agriculture (USDA) – via Southern Research Station.
- Meyer, Frederick G. (1997). "Liquidambar styraciflua". In Flora of North America Editorial Committee (ed.). Flora of North America North of Mexico (FNA). Vol. 3. New York and Oxford: Oxford University Press – via eFloras.org, Missouri Botanical Garden, St. Louis, Missouri and Harvard University Herbaria, Cambridge, Massachusetts.
