= Prostratus =

Scientific classification
- Kingdom: Fungi
- Division: Ascomycota
- Class: Sordariomycetes
- Order: Diaporthales
- Family: Melanconidaceae
- Genus: Prostratus; Sivan., W.H. Hsieh & C.Y. Chen

Type species
- Prostratus cyclobalanopsidis Sivan., W.H. Hsieh & Chi Y. Chen

Genus of fungi

Prostratus is a genus of fungi within the Melanconidaceae family. This is a monotypic genus, containing the single species Prostratus cyclobalanopsidis.
