= Plagiophiale =

Scientific classification
- Kingdom: Fungi
- Division: Ascomycota
- Class: Sordariomycetes
- Order: Diaporthales
- Family: Melanconidaceae
- Genus: Plagiophiale; Petr.

Type species
- Plagiophiale eucarpa (P. Karst.) Petr.

Genus of fungi

Plagiophiale is a genus of fungi within the Melanconidaceae family.
