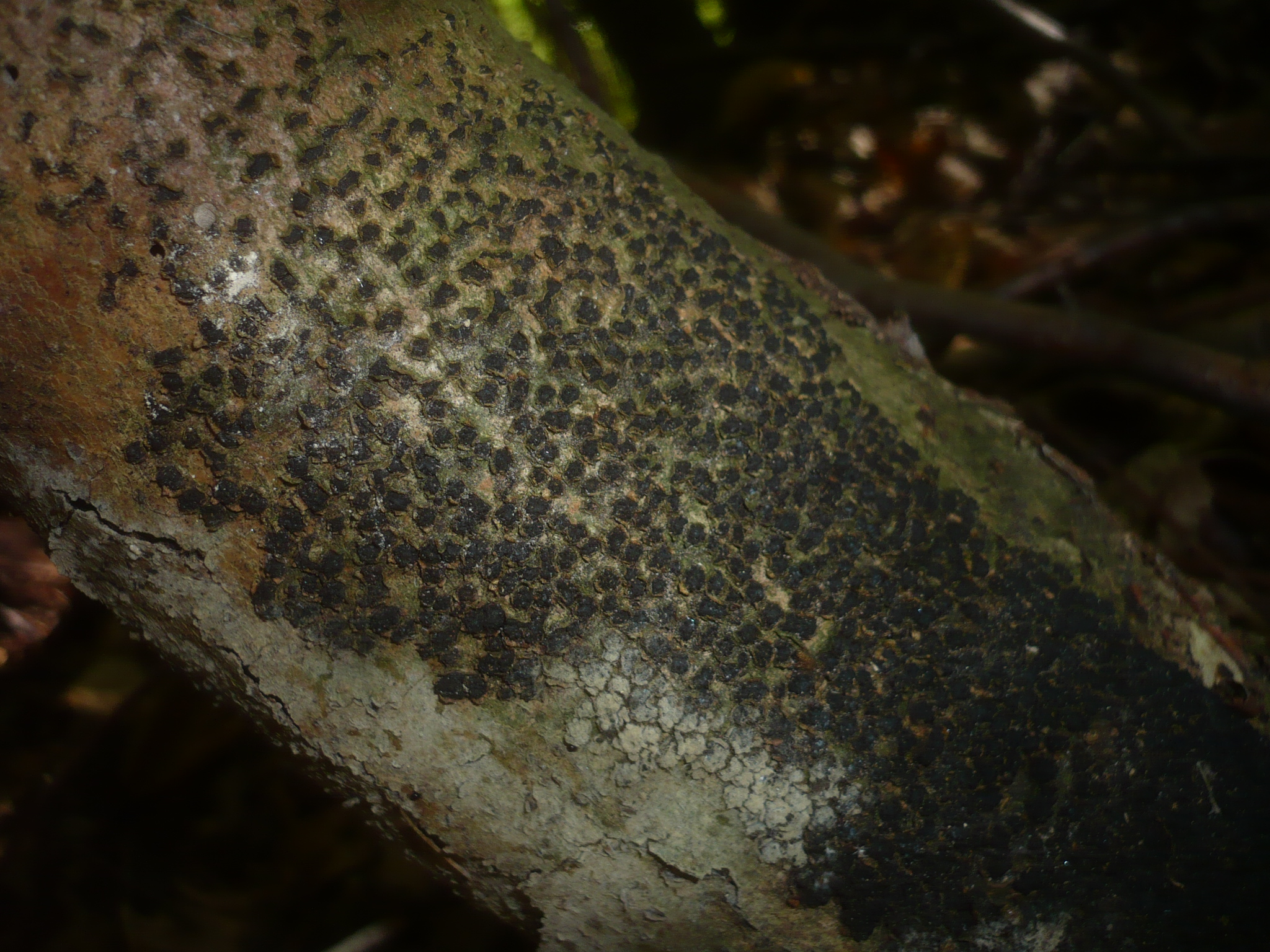
- Melogramma spiniferum on beech

Scientific classification
- Kingdom: Fungi
- Division: Ascomycota
- Class: Sordariomycetes
- Order: Diaporthales
- Family: Melanconidaceae
- Genus: Melogramma; Fr. (1849)

Type species
- Melogramma campylosporum Fr. (1849)

Species
- M. campylosporum M. elongatum M. spiniferum

= Melogramma =

Genus of fungi

Melogramma is a genus of fungi in the family Melanconidaceae. The genus was circumscribed by Elias Magnus Fries in 1849.
