= Hypophloeda =

Scientific classification
- Kingdom: Fungi
- Division: Ascomycota
- Class: Sordariomycetes
- Order: Diaporthales
- Family: Melanconidaceae
- Genus: Hypophloeda; K.D. Hyde & E.B.G. Jones

Type species
- Hypophloeda rhizospora K.D. Hyde & E.B.G. Jones

Genus of fungi

Hypophloeda is a genus of fungi within the Melanconidaceae family. This is a monotypic genus, containing the single species Hypophloeda rhizospora.
