= Melanamphora =

Scientific classification
- Kingdom: Fungi
- Division: Ascomycota
- Class: Sordariomycetes
- Order: Diaporthales
- Family: Melanconidaceae
- Genus: Melanamphora; Lafl.

Type species
- Melanamphora spinifera (Wallr.) Lafl.

Genus of fungi

Melanamphora is a genus of fungi within the Melanconidaceae family. It is a monotypic genus, containing the single species Melanamphora spinifera.
