= Pseudovalsa =

Scientific classification
- Kingdom: Fungi
- Division: Ascomycota
- Class: Sordariomycetes
- Order: Diaporthales
- Family: Melanconidaceae
- Genus: Pseudovalsa; Ces. & De Not.

Type species
- Pseudovalsa lanciformis (Fr.) Ces. & De Not.

Genus of fungi

Pseudovalsa is a genus of fungi within the Melanconidaceae family.
