= Kensinjia =

Scientific classification
- Kingdom: Fungi
- Division: Ascomycota
- Class: Sordariomycetes
- Order: Diaporthales
- Family: Melanconidaceae
- Genus: Kensinjia; J. Reid & C. Booth

Genus of fungi

Kensinjia is a genus of fungi within the Melanconidaceae family.
