= Mebarria =

Scientific classification
- Kingdom: Fungi
- Division: Ascomycota
- Class: Sordariomycetes
- Order: Diaporthales
- Family: Melanconidaceae
- Genus: Mebarria; J. Reid & C. Booth

Genus of fungi

Mebarria is a genus of fungi within the Melanconidaceae family. It was named after mycologist Margaret E. Barr.
