= Macrodiaporthe =

Scientific classification
- Kingdom: Fungi
- Division: Ascomycota
- Class: Sordariomycetes
- Order: Diaporthales
- Family: Melanconidaceae
- Genus: Macrodiaporthe; Petr.

Type species
- Macrodiaporthe occulta (Fuckel) Petr.

Genus of fungi

Macrodiaporthe is a genus of fungi within the Melanconidaceae family. This is a monotypic genus, containing the single species Macrodiaporthe occulta.
