= Wehmeyera =

Scientific classification
- Kingdom: Fungi
- Division: Ascomycota
- Class: Sordariomycetes
- Order: Diaporthales
- Family: Melanconidaceae
- Genus: Wehmeyera; J. Reid & C. Booth

Type species
- Wehmeyera acerina (Wehm.) J. Reid & C. Booth

Genus of fungi

Wehmeyera is a genus of fungi within the Melanconidaceae family. This is a monotypic genus, containing the single species Wehmeyera acerina.
