= Freminaevia =

Scientific classification
- Kingdom: Fungi
- Division: Ascomycota
- Class: Sordariomycetes
- Order: Diaporthales
- Family: Melanconidaceae
- Genus: Freminaevia; Nieuwl.

Genus of fungi

Freminaevia is a genus of fungi within the Melanconidaceae family.
