= Margaret Elizabeth Barr-Bigelow =

Canadian mycologist

- Born: April 16, 1923; Elkhorn, Manitoba
- Died: April 1, 2008 (aged 84); Sidney, British Columbia
- Citizenship: Canada
- Education: University of British Columbia (B.S., M.S.); University of Michigan (Ph.D.)
- Known for: Study of Ascomycetes
- Scientific career
- Fields: Mycology
- Workplaces: University of Massachusetts Amherst, University of Montreal
- Doctoral advisor: Lewis E. Wehmeyer
- Author abbrev. (botany): M.E.Barr

Margaret Elizabeth Barr Bigelow (1923–2008) was a Canadian mycologist known for her contributions to the Ascomycetes fungi.

== Biography ==
She was born on April 16, 1923, in Elkhorn, Manitoba. She studied at the University of British Columbia, receiving her bachelor's degree in 1950 and her Master's in 1952. She went on to study under Lewis E. Wehmeyer at the University of Michigan, and received her doctorate in 1956 for her work on "The taxonomic position of the genus Mycosphaerella as shown by comparative developmental studies".

After receiving her PhD, Barr-Bigelow and her husband, fellow mycologist Howard E. Bigelow, spent several months collecting fungi in Maine while searching for a teaching position. Soon after, Barr took a position at the Botanical Institute at the University of Montreal as a National Research Council fellow. In 1957, the married mycologists traveled to the University of Massachusetts, where Howard Bigelow took a teaching position, but Margaret was unable to do so due to nepotism laws so she took an auxiliary position where she researched and taught. Once the laws changed, Barr Bigelow was able to become a professor. Margaret and Howard remained at the University of Massachusetts for 30 years.

Two years after Howard died in 1987, Margaret moved to Sidney, British Columbia where she lived until her death in 2008.

== Accomplishments ==
- 1986: General Chairman of the AIBS conference in Amherst
- 1986: Faculty Fellowship Award to research Pyrenomycetes
- 1976-1980: Editor in Chief: Mycologia
- 1979-1980: Vice President, Mycological Society of America
- 1981-1982: President, Mycological Society of America
- 1992: Elected Distinguished Mycologist by Mycological Society of America

In addition to the Mycological Society of America, Barr was a member of the American Institute of Biological Societies, International Association of Plant Taxonomists and British Mycological Society. She published more than 150 scientific publications on various Ascomycetes, with the last one described in 2007.

Endowments established by Margaret Barr:

- The Howard E. and Margaret E. Barr Bigelow Endowed Fund for the Life Sciences Collection for biological sciences and geosciences journals
- W.E.B. Du Bois Library, University of Massachusetts
- Howard E. Bigelow Mentor Fund
- Margaret E. Barr Bigelow Mentor Fund for student travel to annual meetings of the MSA

Margaret and her husband collected many fungal specimens, which are now mostly displayed at the New York Botanical Garden. Some of Margaret's collection are also held at the Canada Department of Agriculture in Ottawa and the University of British Columbia.

== Publications ==
- Barr ME. 1978. The Diaporthales in North America with emphasis on Gnomonia and its segregates. Mycol Mem 7:1–232.
- 1987. Prodromus to class Loculoascomycetes. Amherst, Massachusetts: Publ by the author. 168 p.
- 1990a. Melanommatales (Loculoascomycetes). N Am Flor, Ser II 13:1–129.
- 1990b. Some dictyosporous genera and species of Pleosporales in North America. Mem NY Bot Gard 62: 1–92.
- 1990c. Prodromus to nonlichenized, pyrenomycetous members of class Hymenoascomycetes. Mycotaxon 39:43–184.
- Rogerson CT. 1996. The pyrenomycetes described by J.B. Ellis. Mem NY Bot Gard 79:1–137.
- M, Barr ME, Samuels GJ. 1999. Chaetosphaeriaceae, a new family for Chaetosphaeria and its relatives. Sydowia 51:49–70.
- Huhndorf SM. 2000. Loculoascomycetes. In: McLaughlin DJ, McLaughlin E, eds. The Mycota, Vol. VII. Springer-Verlag. p 283–305.
- Marincowitz S, Barr ME. 2007. Rhynchomeliola quercina, a new rostrate ascomycete from oak trees in western Canada. Mycotaxon 101:173–178.

== Genera and species of fungi, named after M.E. Barr ==
- Barrella Ahn & Shearer, 1995
- Barria Z.Q.Yuan, 1994
- Barrina A.W.Ramaley, 1997
- Barrmaelia Rappaz, 1995
- Margaretbarromyces Mindell, Stockey, Beard & Currah, 2007
- Mebarria J.Reid & C.Booth, 1989
- Bricookea barriae Shoemaker & C.E.Babc., 1989
- Gibbera barriae L.Holm & K.Holm, 1980
- Hysterium barrianum E.W.A.Boehm, A.N.Mill., Mugambi, Huhndorf & C.L.Schoch, 2009
- Leptosphaeria barriae Shoemaker, 1985
- Paraphaeosphaeria barriae Checa, 2002
- Phaeosphaeria barriae Fallah, J.L.Crane & Shearer, 1998
- Plagiostoma barriae Sogonov, 2008
- Trichometasphaeria barriae Chleb., 2009
- Wettsteinina barriae Shoemaker & C.E.Babc., 1987

== See also ==
- Category:Taxa named by Margaret Elizabeth Barr-Bigelow
- List of mycologists

== Sources ==
- Blackwell, M.; Simmons, E.; Huhndorf, S (2009). "Margaret Elizabeth Barr Bigelow, 1923–2008". Mycologia. 101 (2): 281–283. doi:10.3852/08-186.
