= Dictyoporthe =

Scientific classification
- Kingdom: Fungi
- Division: Ascomycota
- Class: Sordariomycetes
- Order: Diaporthales
- Family: Melanconidaceae
- Genus: Dictyoporthe; Petr.

Type species
- Dictyoporthe ahmadii Petr.

Genus of fungi

Dictyoporthe is a genus of fungi within the Melanconidaceae family.
