= Plagiostigme =

Scientific classification
- Kingdom: Fungi
- Division: Ascomycota
- Class: Sordariomycetes
- Order: Diaporthales
- Family: Melanconidaceae
- Genus: Plagiostigme; Syd.

Type species
- Plagiostigme couraliae Syd.

Genus of fungi

Plagiostigme is a genus of fungi within the Melanconidaceae family.
