= Gibellulopsis =

Scientific classification
- Domain: Eukaryota
- Kingdom: Fungi
- Division: Ascomycota
- Class: Sordariomycetes
- Order: Glomerellales
- Family: Plectosphaerellaceae
- Genus: Gibellulopsis; Bat. & H. Maia

Genus of fungi

Gibellulopsis is a genus of fungi belonging to the family Plectosphaerellaceae.

The genus was first described by Augusto Chaves Batista and Heraldo da Silva Maia in Anais Soc. Biol. Pernambuco Vol.16 on page 153 in 1959.

The genus name of Gibellia is in honour of Giuseppe Gibelli (1831 – 1898), who was an Italian botanist and lichenologist who was a native of Santa Cristina e Bissone.

Species:

- Gibellulopsis nigrescens (Pethybr.) Zare, W. Gams & Summerb, 2007
