= Wuestneiopsis =

Scientific classification
- Kingdom: Fungi
- Division: Ascomycota
- Class: Sordariomycetes
- Order: Diaporthales
- Family: Melanconidaceae
- Genus: Wuestneiopsis; J. Reid & Dowsett

Type species
- Wuestneiopsis georgiana (J.H. Mill. & G.E. Thomps.) J. Reid & Dowsett

Genus of fungi

Wuestneiopsis is a genus of fungi within the Melanconidaceae family.
