= Barria =

Scientific classification
- Kingdom: Fungi
- Division: Ascomycota
- Class: Dothideomycetes
- Order: Pleosporales
- Family: Phaeosphaeriaceae
- Genus: Barria; Z.Q. Yuan

Type species
- Barria piceae Z.Q. Yuan

Genus of fungi

Barria is a genus of fungi in the family Phaeosphaeriaceae. This is a monotypic genus, containing the single species Barria piceae. It was named after mycologist Margaret E. Barr.
