= Cytomelanconis =

Scientific classification
- Kingdom: Fungi
- Division: Ascomycota
- Class: Sordariomycetes
- Order: Diaporthales
- Family: Melanconidaceae
- Genus: Cytomelanconis; Naumov

Type species
- Cytomelanconis systema-solare Naumov

Genus of fungi

Cytomelanconis is a genus of fungi within the Melanconidaceae family. This is a monotypic genus, containing the single species Cytomelanconis systema-solare.
