= Pseudovalsella =

Scientific classification
- Kingdom: Fungi
- Division: Ascomycota
- Class: Sordariomycetes
- Order: Diaporthales
- Family: Melanconidaceae
- Genus: Pseudovalsella; Höhn.

Type species
- Pseudovalsella thelebola (Fr.) Höhn.

Genus of fungi

Pseudovalsella is a genus of fungi within the Melanconidaceae family.
