= Prosthecium =

Scientific classification
- Kingdom: Fungi
- Division: Ascomycota
- Class: Sordariomycetes
- Order: Diaporthales
- Family: Melanconidaceae
- Genus: Prosthecium; Fresen.

Type species
- Prosthecium ellipsosporum Fresen.

Genus of fungi

Prosthecium is a genus of fungi within the Melanconidaceae family.
