= Ceratoporthe =

Scientific classification
- Kingdom: Fungi
- Division: Ascomycota
- Class: Sordariomycetes
- Order: Diaporthales
- Family: Melanconidaceae
- Genus: Ceratoporthe; Petr.

Type species
- Ceratoporthe didymospora Petr.

Genus of fungi

Ceratoporthe is a genus of fungi within the Melanconidaceae family.
