= Melanconis carthusiana =

Scientific classification
- Kingdom: Fungi
- Division: Ascomycota
- Class: Sordariomycetes
- Order: Diaporthales
- Family: Melanconidaceae
- Genus: Melanconis
- Species: M. carthusiana

Binomial name
- Melanconis carthusiana Tul., (1856)

Species of fungus

Melanconis carthusiana is a plant pathogen.
