= Gibellia =

Scientific classification
- Kingdom: Fungi
- Division: Ascomycota
- Class: Sordariomycetes
- Order: Diaporthales
- Family: Melanconidaceae
- Genus: Gibellia; Sacc.

Genus of fungi

Gibellia is a genus of fungi within the Melanconidaceae family. According to the 2007 Outline of Ascomycota, the placement of this genus within the Melanconidaceae is uncertain.

The genus name of Gibellia is in honour of Giuseppe Gibelli (1831 – 1898), who was an Italian botanist and lichenologist who was a native of Santa Cristina e Bissone.

The genus was circumscribed by Pier Andrea Saccardo in Atti Reale Ist. Veneto Sci. Lett. Arti series 6, Vol.3 onpage 714 in 1885.
