= Botanamphora =

Scientific classification
- Kingdom: Fungi
- Division: Ascomycota
- Class: Sordariomycetes
- Order: Diaporthales
- Family: Melanconidaceae
- Genus: Botanamphora; Nograsek & Scheuer

Genus of fungi

Botanamphora is a genus of fungi within the Melanconidaceae family.
