= List of holiday cacti diseases =

This is a list of diseases of holiday cacti (Schlumbergera truncata).

== Bacterial diseases ==
Bacterial diseases
Bacterial soft rot	Erwinia carotovora subsp. carotovora

== Fungal diseases ==
Fungal diseases
Alternaria stem spot	Alternaria sp.
Armillaria root rot	Armillaria tabescens
Anthracnose	Glomerella cingulata Colletotrichum gloeosporioides [anamorph]
Bipolaris blight	Bipolaris cactivora
Cercospora stem spot	Cercospora sp.
Fusarium root and stem rot	Fusarium oxysporum Fusarium moniliforme
Phomopsis stem spot	Phomopsis sp.
Phytophthora stem rot	Phytophthora parasitica = Phytophthora nicotianae Phytophthora spp.
Pythium root and stem rot	Pythium aphanidermatum Pythium irregulare
Rhizoctonia root and stem rot	Rhizoctonia solani
Tip blight	Dichotomophthora spp.

== Nematodes, parasitic ==
Nematodes, parasitic
Lesion nematode	Pratylenchus vulnus

== Viral and viroid diseases ==
Viral and viroid diseases
Impatiens necrotic spot	Impatiens necrotic spot virus (INSV)
Spotted wilt	Tomato spotted wilt virus (TSWV)
