= Massariovalsa =

Scientific classification
- Kingdom: Fungi
- Division: Ascomycota
- Class: Sordariomycetes
- Order: Diaporthales
- Family: Melanconidaceae
- Genus: Massariovalsa; Sacc.

Type species
- Massariovalsa sudans (Berk. & M.A. Curtis) Sacc.

Genus of fungi

Massariovalsa is a genus of fungi within the Melanconidaceae family.

The genus name of Massariovalsa is in honour of Giuseppe Filippo Massara (1792-1839), who was an Italian doctor and botanist, working in Sondrio.

The genus was circumscribed by Pier Andrea Saccardo in Michelia vol.2 on page 569 in 1882.
