= Pratylenchus vulnus =

Scientific classification
- Domain: Eukaryota
- Kingdom: Animalia
- Phylum: Nematoda
- Class: Secernentea
- Order: Tylenchida
- Family: Pratylenchidae
- Genus: Pratylenchus
- Species: P. vulnus

Binomial name
- Pratylenchus vulnus Allen & Jensen, 1951

Species of nematode

Pratylenchus vulnus (also known by the common names walnut meadow nematode and walnut root-lesion nematode) is a species of plant pathogenic nematode best known for infecting Persian walnut. It is also known to infest potatoes, apricots, peaches and nectarines, holiday cacti, grape and citruses.
