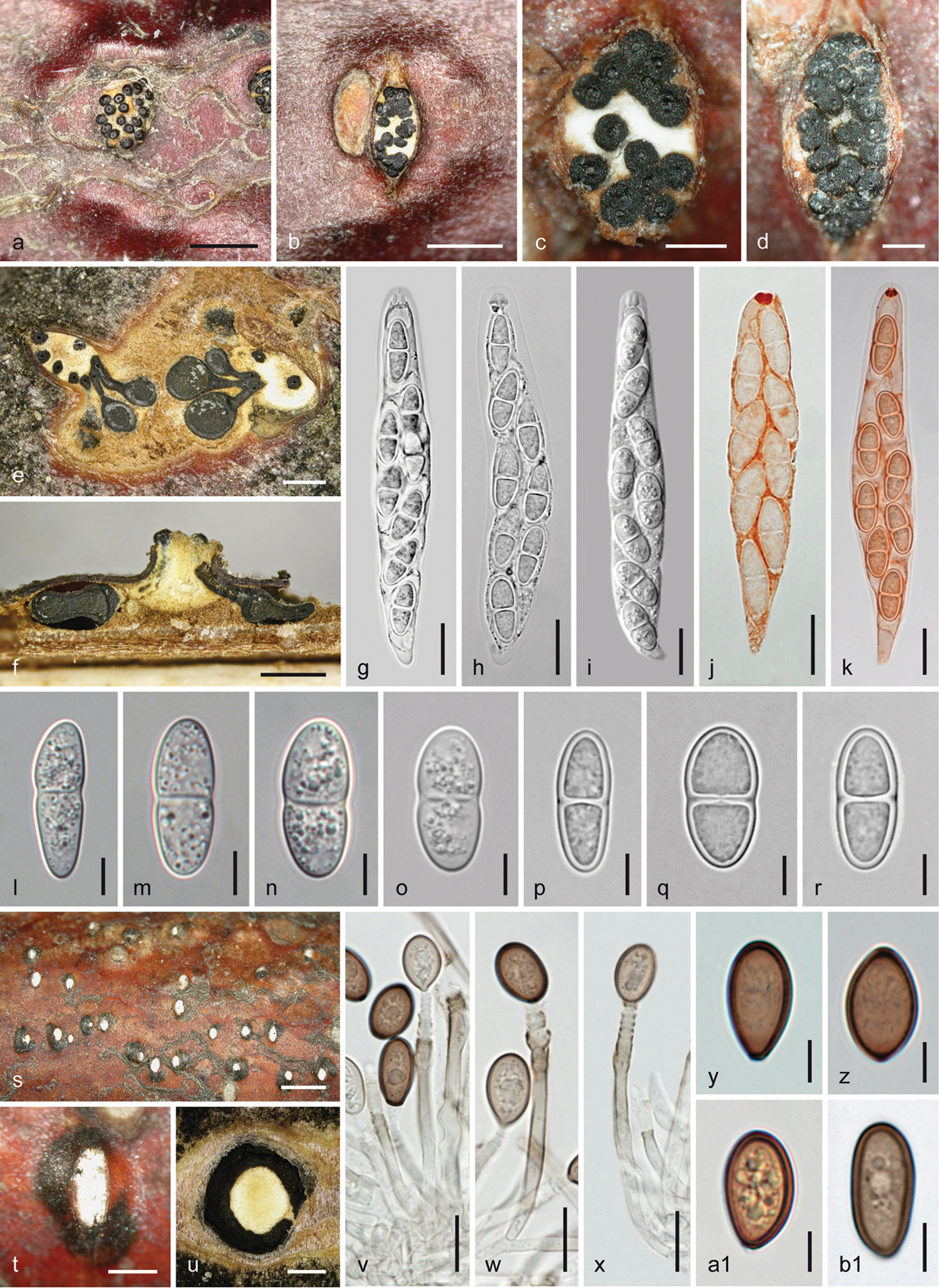
- Melanconis stilbostoma

Scientific classification
- Kingdom: Fungi
- Division: Ascomycota
- Class: Sordariomycetes
- Order: Diaporthales
- Family: Melanconidaceae
- Genus: Melanconis; Tul. & C. Tul.

Type species
- Melanconis stilbostoma (Fr.) Tul. & C. Tul.

Species
- Species include: Melanconis carthusiana; Melanconis stilbostoma

= Melanconis =

Genus of fungi

Melanconis is a genus of ascomycete fungi within the Melanconidaceae family. It consists of parasites which mostly grow on tree bark.
