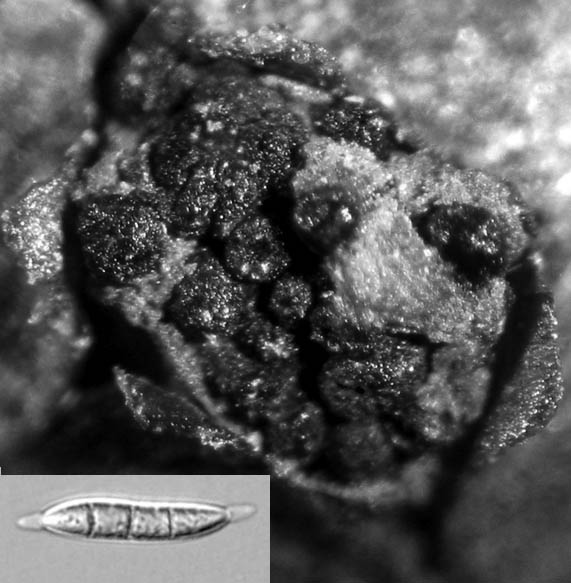

Scientific classification
- Kingdom: Fungi
- Division: Ascomycota
- Class: Sordariomycetes
- Order: Diaporthales
- Family: Melanconidaceae
- Genus: Phragmodiaporthe; Wehm.

Type species
- Phragmodiaporthe caryae (Peck) Wehm.

= Phragmodiaporthe =

Genus of fungi

Phragmodiaporthe is a genus of fungi within the Melanconidaceae family.
