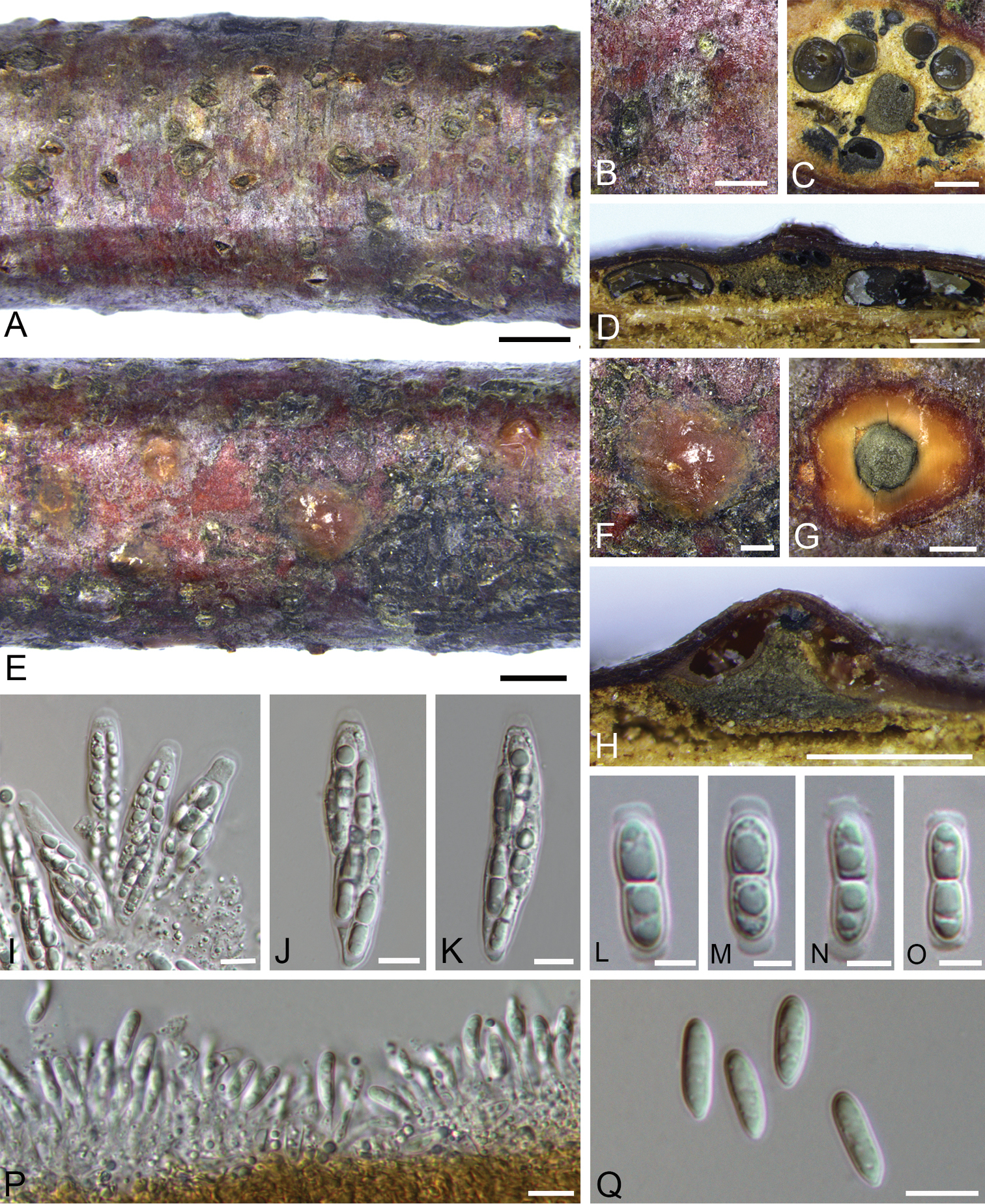
- Melanconiella betulicola

Scientific classification
- Kingdom: Fungi
- Division: Ascomycota
- Class: Sordariomycetes
- Order: Diaporthales
- Family: Melanconidaceae
- Genus: Melanconiella

Type species
- Melanconiella spodiaea

= Melanconiella =

Genus of fungi

Melanconiella is a genus of ascomycete fungi that belong to order Diaporthales. These fungi are diseases of trees such as birch, walnut and dogwood.
