= Gibellulopsis nigrescens =

Scientific classification
- Kingdom: Fungi
- Division: Ascomycota
- Class: Sordariomycetes
- Order: Glomerellales
- Family: Plectosphaerellaceae
- Genus: Gibellulopsis
- Species: G. nigrescens

Binomial name
- Gibellulopsis nigrescens (Pethybr.) Zare, W.Gams & Summerb., 2007

Species of fungus

Gibellulopsis nigrescens is a species of fungus belonging to the family Plectosphaerellaceae.

It has cosmopolitan distribution.
