= Dicarpella =

Scientific classification
- Kingdom: Fungi
- Division: Ascomycota
- Class: Sordariomycetes
- Order: Diaporthales
- Family: Melanconidaceae
- Genus: Dicarpella; Syd. & P. Syd.

Type species
- Dicarpella bina (Harkn.) Syd. & P. Syd.

Genus of fungi

Dicarpella is a genus of fungi within the Melanconidaceae family.
