= Melanconium =

Scientific classification
- Domain: Eukaryota
- Kingdom: Fungi
- Division: Ascomycota
- Class: Sordariomycetes
- Order: Diaporthales
- Family: Melanconidaceae
- Genus: Melanconium; Link

Genus of fungi belong to the Melanconidaceae family

Melanconium is a genus of fungi belonging to the family Melanconidaceae.

The genus has almost cosmopolitan distribution.

== Species ==
Species:

- Melanconium abellinense Sacc.
- Melanconium acerinum Ellis & Everh.
- Melanconium acutum Corda
