= Xanthomonas campestris pv. juglandis =

Scientific classification
- Domain: Bacteria
- Kingdom: Pseudomonadati
- Phylum: Pseudomonadota
- Class: Gammaproteobacteria
- Order: Xanthomonadales
- Family: Xanthomonadaceae
- Genus: Xanthomonas
- Species: X. campestris
- Pathovar: X. c. pv. juglandis

Trionomial name
- Xanthomonas campestris pv. juglandis

Variety of bacteria

Xanthomonas campestris pv. juglandis is an anaerobic, Gram negative, rod-shaped bacteria that can affect walnut trees though the flowers, buds, shoots, branches, trunk, and fruit. It can have devastating effects including premature fruit drop and lesions on the plant. This pathogen was first isolated by Newton B. Pierce in California in 1896 and was then named Pseudomonas juglandis. In 1905 it was reclassified as Bacterium juglandis, in 1930 it became Phytomas juglandis, and in 1939 it was named Xanthomas juglandis. The International Standards for Naming Pathovars declared it to be named Xanthomonas campestris pv. juglandis in 1980. There have been recent proposals to change the name once again to Xanthomonas arboricola pv. juglandis, but this has not yet been universally accepted.

== Host and symptoms ==
Xanthomonas campestris pv. juglandis overwinters in the walnut buds, catkins, leaves, and infected fruit still hanging on the tree, and twig lesions. During this time, these buds may remain asymptomatic even just a few days before budburst. In the spring, when the buds begin to open, the bacteria invade and begin infecting the internal bud and developing fruit. Wind and rain splash play a large role in spreading this disease, as rain splash makes it easier for bacteria to move from infected plant tissue to healthy buds. Aerial dissemination of pollen from infected catkins have been recorded to infect the receiving bud/tree in France, but conflicting data has been shown for trees in California where researchers did not find a link between peak disease development and peak pollen shedding. Once infected through the pistils, flowers, or fruit, symptoms of the disease may begin to take shape, such as dark green, circular water soaked areas on the leaves, developing lesions which grow in size, walnut shell and fruit stunting, and/or walnut shell staining.

Lesions which appear on the leaves may grow larger and the center may turn black or translucent. This area may then ooze bacterial discharge and polysaccharides and further infect other tissue it may travel to by rain splash. The size of the lesions vary in young and more mature leaves. Young leaves have lesions from one to a few millimeters while older leaf lesions can range from a few millimeters to half of the leaf.

Premature nut fall occurs when infection takes place before the formation and hardening of the shell tissue and is able to rot and shrivel the kernel. The tree then sheds the diseased nut.

== Environment ==
It's important to keep environmental factors in mind because bacteria thrive in wet and humid conditions. An experiment connecting this disease and water concluded that trees with plastic covers had little to no diseases compared to those without the plastic covers. Another data analysis concluded that areas with more water fall contained a higher percentage of trees with disease compared to close regions without as much rainfall. For disease to occur the amount of humidity and wetness must be between 12 and 24 h and 15° to 25° Celsius. These conditions must also happen during post bloom fruit and 10 week old fruit. New infection during the summer months is rare because the conditions for it are usually not present.

In addition to Xanthomonas campestris pv. juglandis, the wounds are often preyed upon by other pathogens which make the situation worse. Fusarium spp. and Alternaria spp. which are fungal saprophytes, often act in unison with the dead tissue left by lesions caused by the bacteria. Mites and insects may also carry the bacteria from tree to tree.

== Management ==
Management for this bacterial disease can be difficult and requires precise timing. Bactericidal sanitation treatments, chemical elicitors of induced resistance, and antibiotics are commonly used to help plant resistances, but are not consistent or do not seem to work at all. Certain cultivars of walnut seem to have more resistance to the bacteria that bloom later in the season, different jrPPo1 amounts, and polyphenic responses. Variants that bloom later in the season will have a better chance at avoiding the wet spring rains which makes the tree more susceptible to infection. Cultivars with varying jrPPo1 levels can create leaves, flowers and buds with different hair densities and wax amounts. These provide physical barriers from the microbes which rest on the leaf surface. Polyphenic responses are the plant's defense system against pests and microbial pathogens. Phenols such as flavanol and hydroxycinnamic acids help the plant avoid herbivores and microorganisms.

Copper biocide spraying has seen the most success, though copper resistant and tolerant strains of X. campestris pv. juglandis have been found. Also, soils which abstain long term copper spraying have been found to culture poor growing soils for the trees themselves. Xanthocast™, founded at the University of California, Davis, is a program which takes records of the wetness period, duration, and temperature from local weather stations and can foretell the possible occurrence of the infection, and can then alert farmers in the area to spray pre-emptively.
