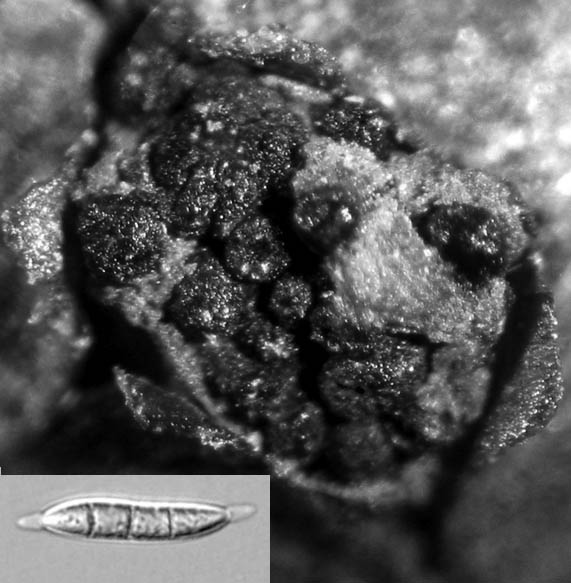
- Phragmodiaporthe padi

Scientific classification
- Kingdom: Fungi
- Division: Ascomycota
- Class: Sordariomycetes
- Order: Diaporthales
- Family: Melanconidaceae; G.Winter (1886)

Type genus
- Melanconis Tul. & C.Tul. (1863)

Genera
- See text

= Melanconidaceae =

Family of fungi

The Melanconidaceae are a family of fungi in the order Diaporthales, class Sordariomycetes.

== Genera ==
The following is a list of genera within the Melanconidaceae, according to the 2007 Outline of Ascomycota. The placement of Gibellia in this family is uncertain.

- Botanamphora
- Ceratoporthe
- Cytomelanconis
- Dicarpella
- Dictyoporthe
- Freminaevia
- Gibellia
- Hypophloeda
- Kensinjia
- Macrodiaporthe
- Massariovalsa
- Mebarria
- Melanamphora
- Melanconiella
- Melanconis
- Melanconium
- Melogramma
- Phragmodiaporthe
- Plagiophiale
- Plagiostigme
- Prosthecium
- Prostratus
- Pseudovalsa
- Pseudovalsella
- Wehmeyera
- Wuestneia
- Wuestneiopsis
