= Human viruses in water =

Transmission route of human viruses

Viruses are a major cause of human waterborne and water-related diseases. Waterborne diseases are caused by water that is contaminated by human and animal urine and feces that contain pathogenic microorganisms. A subject can get infected through contact with or consumption of the contaminated water. Viruses affect all living organisms from single cellular plants, bacteria and animal to the highest forms of plants and animals including human beings. Within a specific kingdom ( Plantae, Animalia, Fungi etc.) the localization of viruses colonizing the host can vary: Some human viruses, for example, HIV, colonizes only the immune system, while influenza viruses on the other hand can colonize either the upper respiratory tract or the lower respiratory tract depending on the type (human Influenza virus or avian influenza viruses respectively). Different viruses can have different routes of transmission; for example, HIV is directly transferred by contaminated body fluids from an infected host into the tissue or bloodstream of a new host while influenza is airborne and transmitted through inhalation of contaminated air containing viral particles by a new host. Research has also suggested that solid surface plays a role in the transmission of water viruses. In experiments that used E.coli phages, Qβ, fr, T4, and MS2 confirmed that viruses survive on a solid surface longer compared to when they are in water. Because of this adaptation to survive longer on solid surfaces, viruses now have a prolonged opportunities to infect humans. Enteric viruses primarily infect the intestinal tract through ingestion of food and water contaminated with viruses of fecal origin. Some viruses can be transmitted through all three routes of transmission.

Water virology started about half a century ago when scientists attempted to detect the polio virus in water samples. Since then, other pathogenic viruses that are responsible for gastroenteritis, hepatitis, and many other virus strains have replaced enteroviruses as the main aim for detection in the water environment.

== History ==
=== Major outbreaks ===
Water virology was born after a large hepatitis outbreak transmitted through water was confirmed in New Delhi between December 1955 and January 1956.

Viruses can cause massive human mortality. The smallpox virus killed an estimated 10 to 15 million people per year until 1967. Smallpox was finally eliminated in 1977 by extinction of the virus through vaccination, and the impact of viruses such as influenza, poliomyelitis and measles are mainly controlled by vaccination.

Despite advances in vaccination and prevention of viral diseases, it is estimated that in the 1980s a child died approximately every six seconds from diarrhea confirmed by WHO. Many cases of hepatitis A and/or E, both of which are enteric viruses, are typically transmitted by food and water. Extreme examples include the outbreak of 300,000 cases of hepatitis A and 25,000 cases of gastroenteritis in 1988 in Shanghai caused by shellfish harvested from a sewage polluted estuary. In 1991, an outbreak of 79,000 cases of hepatitis E in Kanpur was ascribed to drinking polluted water.

A more recent outbreak of Hepatitis E in South Sudan killed 88 people. Medecins Sans Frontieres (MSF) said it had treated almost 4,000 patients since the outbreak was identified in South Sudan in July 2012. In this outbreak, Hepatitis E, which causes liver infections, and was thought to be spread by drinking water contaminated with feces. Even more recently In 2014, another Hepatitis E outbreak occurred in south Sudan refugee camp situated in Ethiopia. The outbreak, which began in April 2014 and ended in January 2015, claimed a total of twenty-one lives.

Sewage contaminated water contains many viruses, over one hundred species are reported and can lead to diseases that affect human beings. For example, hepatitis, gastroenteritis, meningitis, fever, rash, and conjunctivitis can all be spread through contaminated water. More viruses are being discovered in water because of new detection and characterization methods, although only some of these viruses are human pathogens.

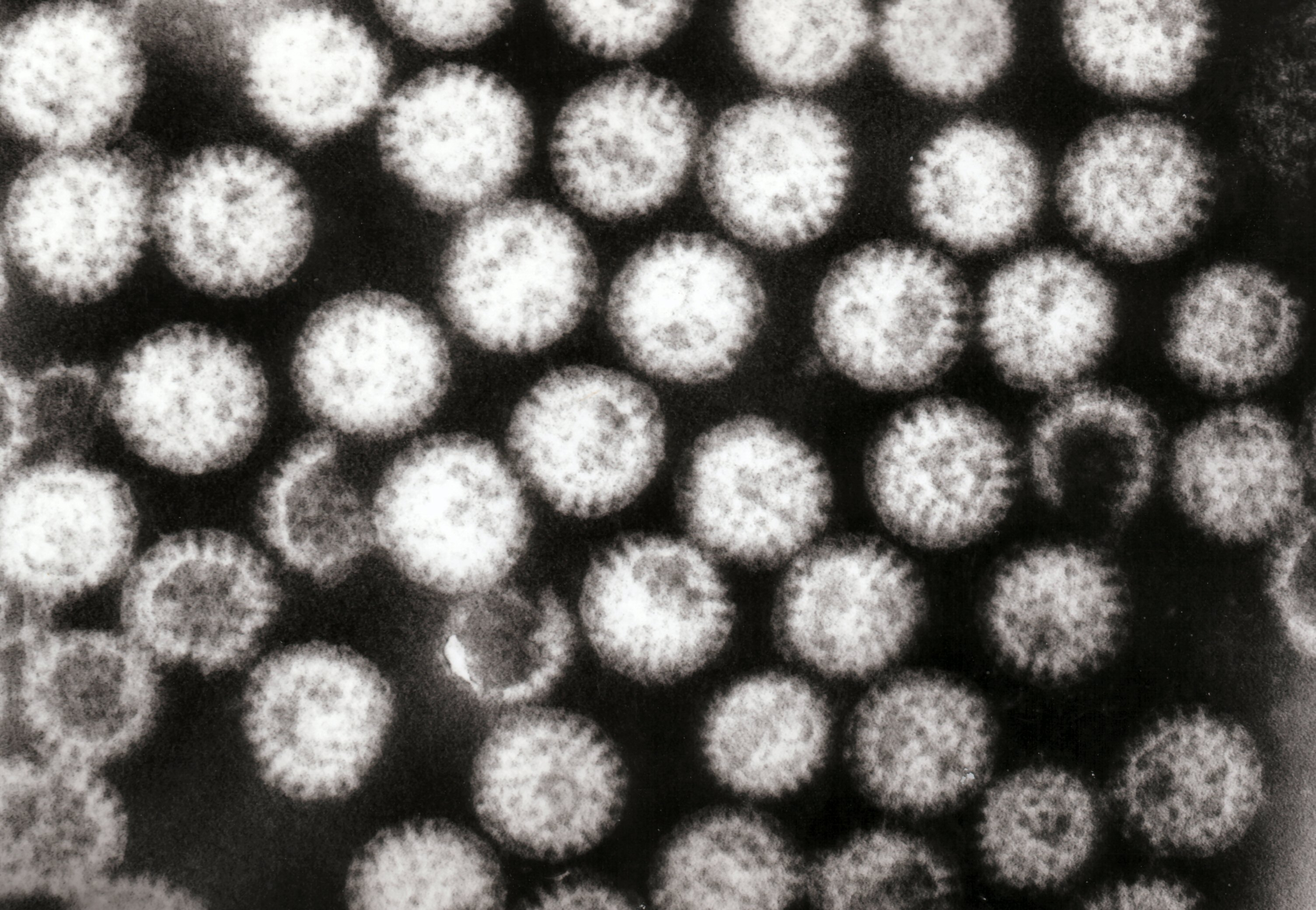
Rotavirus, an example of human water viruses

Family	Genus	Species	Common name	Disease Caused
Adenovirus	Mastadenovirus	Human mastadenovirus A through G	adenovirus	Adenovirus infection, pharyngitis, conjunctivitis, fever
Astrovirus	Mamastrovirus	Human astrovirus	astrovirus	Gastroenteritis, diarrhea
Calicivirus	Norovirus	Norwalk virus	norovirus, winter vomiting bug	Gastroenteritis, fever
Coronaviridae	Coronavirinae	SARS coronavirus	SARS-CoV	SARS, gastroenteritis, respiratory disease
Coronaviridae	Torovirus	Human torovirus	torovirus	Gastroenteritis
Hepeviridae	Orthohepevirus	Orthohepevirus A	Hepatitis E virus, HEV	Hepatitis E
Picornavirus	Enterovirus	Enterovirus A	Coxsackie A virus	Hand, foot, and mouth disease, paralysis, meningitis, fever, respiratory disease, myocarditis, heart anomalies
Picornavirus	Enterovirus	Enterovirus B	echovirus	Meningitis, fever, respiratory disease, rush, gastroenteritis
Picornavirus	Enterovirus	Enterovirus C	poliovirus	Polio
Picornavirus	Hepatovirus	Hepatovirus A	hepatitis A virus, HAV	Hepatitis A
Polyomaviridae	Polyomavirus	JC virus	JC virus	Progressive multifocal leukoencephalopathy
Reovirus	Rotavirus	Rotavirus A, B, & C	rotavirus	Gastroenteritis

== Virus survival in water ==
Viruses need a suitable environment to survive in. There are many characteristics that control the survival of viruses in water such as temperature, light, pH, salinity, organic matter, suspended solids or sediments, and air–water interfaces.

=== Temperature ===
Temperature has the highest effect on virus's survival in water since lower temperatures are the key to longer virus survival. For instance, an article published in 2018 noted that it takes one year for certain viruses including poliovirus and echovirus to decrease by a 5log unit at a temperature of 4°C, while it takes only a week to obtain same result at a temperature of 37°C (human body temperature). The rate of protein, nucleic acid denaturation and chemical reactions that destroy the viral capsid are increased at higher temperatures, thus viruses will survive best at low temperatures. Hepatitis A, adenoviruses and parvoviruses have the highest survival rate in low temperatures amongst enteric viruses.

=== Light ===
Ultraviolet light (UV) is the light in sunlight and can inactivate viruses by causing cross-linking of the nucleotides in the viral genome. Many viruses in water are exterminated in the presence of sunlight. The combination of higher temperatures and more UV in the summer time corresponds to shorter viral survival in summer compared to winter. Double stranded DNA viruses like adenoviruses are more resistant to UV light inactivation than enteroviruses because they can use their host cell to repair the damage caused by the UV light.

Visible light can also affect virus survival by a process called photodynamic inactivation but the length and intensity of the light exposure can change the inactivation rate.

=== pH ===
The pH of most natural water is between 5–9. Enteric viruses are stable in these conditions. On the other hand, many enteric viruses are more stable at pH 3-5 than at pH 9 and 12. Enteroviruses can survive at pH 11–11.5 and 1–2, but for only short periods. Adenoviruses and rotaviruses are delicate to a pH of 10 or greater and leads to inactivation.

=== Salts and metals ===
In a general perspective, viruses don't survive in areas with high concentration of salt. Thus, viruses can live longer in a freshwater habitat than water bodies with high salt concentration. It is also known that certain heavy metals are toxic to viruses.

=== Interface ===
Some types of coliphages (a type of bacteriophage) are inactive in an of air-water-solid interface. This is due to the unfolding of the viruses' protein capsid (which is a crucial component for infecting the host). Aggravation of this effect is seen when the ionic strength of the solution increases

=== Aggregation ===
Aggregation is one of the most known methods for the survival of viruses. In a liquid environment, viruses tend to form a clump (aggregation). This aggregation result in a reduced rate of virus inactivation promptly showing that viral particles that do not aggregate are more easily destroyed. It has also been proven that aggregation may form spontaneously or may result by nucleation on particles of water.

== Virus removal from water ==
Water that is intended for drinking should go through some treatment to reduce pathogenic viral and bacterial concentrations. As the density of the human population has increased the incidence of sewage contamination of water has increased as well, thus the risk to humans from pathogenic viruses will increase if precautions are not taken.

Scientific studies suggest that the most common viruses found are caliciviruses, astroviruses and enteric viruses. Laboratories are still looking for improved methods to detect these pathogenic viruses. Reducing the amount of viruses in drinking water is accomplished by various treatments that are typically part of drinking water treatment systems in developed countries.

Water purification of surface water (water from lakes, rivers, or reservoirs) typically utilizes four treatment stages: coagulation and flocculation, sedimentation, filtration, and disinfection. The first three stages remove mainly dirt and larger particles, although filtration does reduce the number of viruses and bacteria in the water the number of pathogens present after filtration is still considered too high for drinking water. Purification of water from underground aquifers, called ground water, may skip some of these steps as ground water tends to have fewer contaminants than surface water. The last step, disinfection, is primarily responsible for the reduction of pathogenic viruses to safe levels in all drinking water sources. The most common disinfectants used are chlorine and chloramine. Ozone and UV light can also be used to treat large volumes of water to remove pathogens.

In an article published in 2010, it was determined that nanoparticles of silver could significantly inactivate the activity of some water viruses. When 5.4 ml of the nanoparticles of silver was added to a water virus, its activity decreased by 4log.

== Prevention of water viruses ==
The quality of drinking water is ensured through a framework of water safety plans that ensures the safe disposal of human waste so that drinking water supplies are not contaminated. Improving the water supply, sanitation, hygiene and management of our water resources could prevent ten percent of total global disease.

Half of the hospital beds occupied in the world are related to the lack of safe drinking water. Unsafe water leads to the 88% of the global cases of diarrhea and 90% of the deaths of diarreaheal diseases in children under five years old. Most of these deaths occur in developing countries due to poverty and the high cost of safe water. An article published in 2003 by CDC concluded that the death of children (less than five years of age) caused by rotavirus on a global scale ranges between 352,000 and 592,000.

Approximately 1.1 billion people do not have access to improved water and 2.4 billion people do not have access to sanitation facilities. This situation leads to 2 million preventable deaths each year.

== See also ==
- Waterborne diseases
