= Viral hepatitis =

Liver inflammation from a viral infection

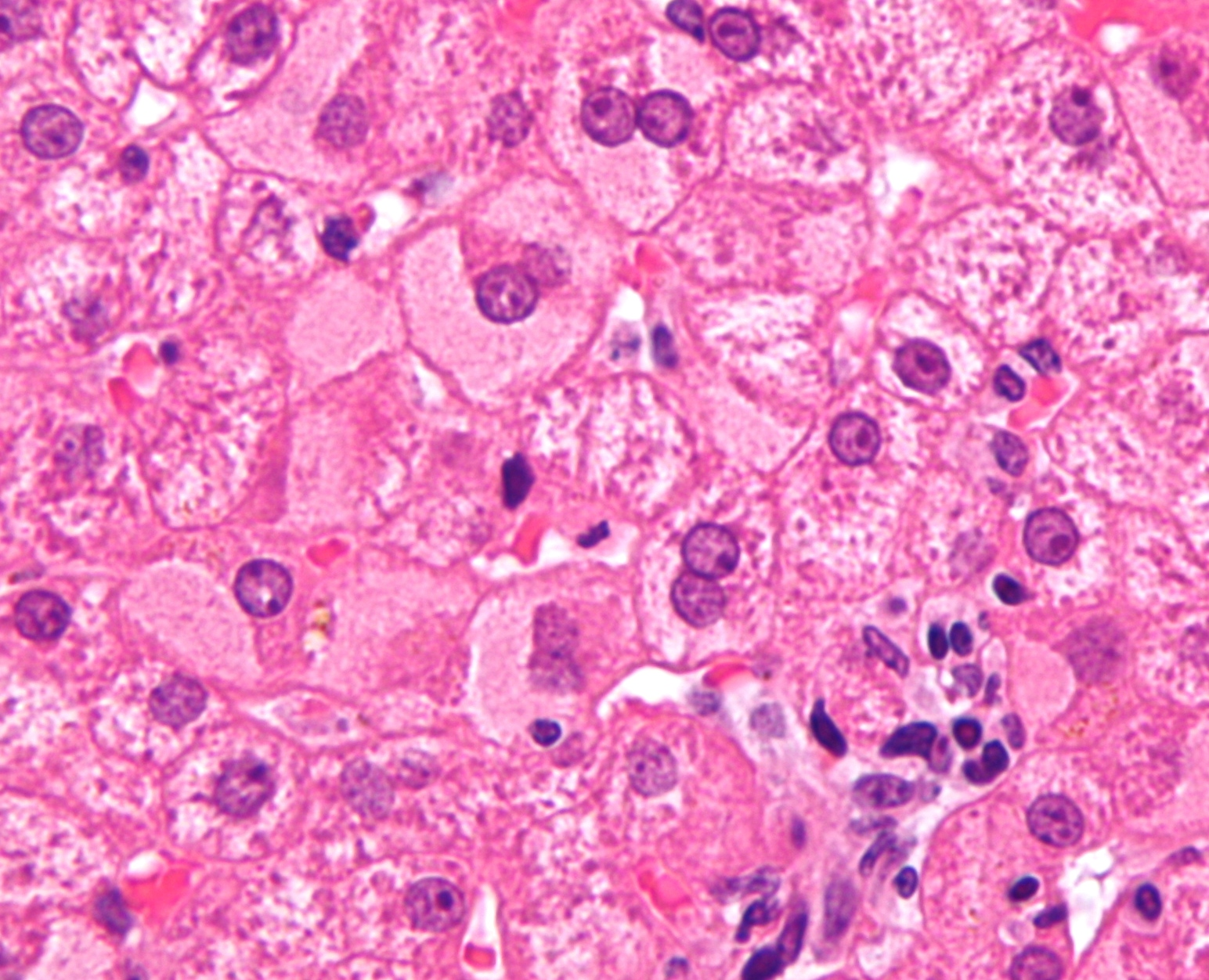
- Micrograph showing ground glass hepatocytes, which are seen in chronic hepatitis B infections (a type of viral hepatitis), and represent accumulations of viral antigen in the endoplasmic reticulum. H&E stain.
- Specialty: Infectious diseases, gastroenterology

Viral hepatitis is liver inflammation due to a viral infection. It may present in acute form as a recent infection with relatively rapid onset, or in chronic form, typically progressing from a long-lasting asymptomatic condition up to a decompensated hepatic disease and hepatocellular carcinoma (HCC).

The most common causes of viral hepatitis are the five unrelated hepatotropic viruses hepatitis A, B, C, D, and E. Other viruses can also cause liver inflammation, including cytomegalovirus, Epstein–Barr virus, and yellow fever. There also have been scores of recorded cases of viral hepatitis caused by herpes simplex virus.

== Mode of transmission ==
Viral hepatitis is either transmitted through contaminated food or water (A, E) or via blood and body fluids (B, C). The viruses transmitted through water and food are mostly self-limited, resulting in acute illness with full resolution. The blood borne viruses (B, C) can cause both acute and chronic liver disease and can be transmitted from mother to child during birth, through contact with body fluids during sex, unsafe injections and through unscreened blood transfusions.

The most common types of hepatitis can be prevented or treated. Hepatitis A and hepatitis B can be prevented by vaccination. Effective treatments for hepatitis C are available but costly.

In 2013, about 1.5 million people died from viral hepatitis, most commonly due to hepatitis B and C. East Asia, in particular Mongolia, is the region most affected.

== Hepatitis viruses ==
The most common cause of hepatitis is viral. Although the effects of various viruses are all classified under the disease hepatitis, these viruses are not all related.

Hepatitis viruses
	Hepatitis A virus (HAV)	Hepatitis B virus (HBV)	Hepatitis C virus (HCV)	Hepatitis D virus (HDV)	Hepatitis E virus (HEV)
Viral species	Hepatovirus A	Hepatitis B virus	Hepacivirus C	Hepatitis delta virus	Orthohepevirus A
Viral family	Picornaviridae	Hepadnaviridae	Flaviviridae	Kolmioviridae	Hepeviridae
Genome	(+)ssRNA	dsDNA-RT	(+)ssRNA	(−)ssRNA	(+)ssRNA
Antigens		HBsAg, HBeAg	Core antigen	Delta antigen	
Transmission	Enteral	Parenteral	Parenteral	Parenteral	Enteral
Incubation period	20–40 days	45–160 days	15–150 days	30–60 days	15–60 days
Severity/Chronicity	Mild; acute	Occasionally severe; 5–10% chronic	Subclinical; 70% chronic	Exacerbates symptoms of HBV; chronic with HBV	Mild in normal patients; severe in pregnant women; acute
Vaccine	2 injections; at least 20 years of protection	3 injections; lifetime protection	None available	None available, but not considered necessary; Hep B vaccine provides protection	Investigational (approved in China)

== Viral hepatitis types ==
=== Hepatitis A ===
Hepatitis A or infectious jaundice is caused by hepatitis A virus (HAV), a picornavirus transmitted by the fecal-oral route often associated with ingestion of contaminated food. It causes an acute form of hepatitis and does not have a chronic stage. A patient's immune system makes antibodies against HAV that confer immunity against future infection. People with hepatitis A are advised to rest, stay hydrated and avoid alcohol. A vaccine is available that will prevent HAV infection for up to 10 years. Hepatitis A can be spread through personal contact, consumption of raw sea food, or drinking contaminated water. This occurs primarily in third world countries. The time between the infection and the start of the illness averages 28 days. (ranging from 15 to 50 days), Most patients recover fully within 2 months, although approximately 15% of affected people may experience continuous or relapsing symptoms from six months to a year following initial diagnosis.

Hepatitis A
Marker	Detection Time	Description	Significance
Faecal HAV	2–4 weeks or 28 days	–	Early detection
Ig M anti HAV	4–12 weeks	Enzyme immunoassay for antibodies	During acute Illness
Ig G anti HAV	5 weeks–persistent	Enzyme immunoassay for antibodies	Old infection or reinfection

=== Hepatitis B ===
Hepatitis B is caused by the hepatitis B virus, a hepadnavirus that can cause both acute and chronic hepatitis. Chronic hepatitis develops in the 15% of adults who are unable to eliminate the virus after an initial infection. Identified methods of transmission include contact with blood, blood transfusion (now rare), unsanitary tattoos, sex (through sexual intercourse or contact with bodily fluids), or mother-to-child by breast feeding; there is minimal evidence of transplacental crossing. However, in about half of cases the source of infection cannot be determined. Blood contact can occur by sharing syringes in intravenous drug use, shaving accessories such as razor blades, or touching wounds on infected persons. Needle-exchange programmes have been created in many countries as a form of prevention.

Patients with chronic hepatitis B have antibodies against the virus, but not enough to clear the infected liver cells. The continued production of virus and countervailing antibodies is a likely cause of the immune complex disease seen in these patients. A vaccine is available to prevent infection for life. Hepatitis B infections result in 500,000 to 1,200,000 deaths per year worldwide due to the complications of chronic hepatitis, cirrhosis, and hepatocellular carcinoma (HCC). Hepatitis B is endemic in a number of (mainly South-East Asian) countries, making cirrhosis and hepatocellular carcinoma big killers. There are eight treatment options approved by the U.S. Food and Drug Administration (FDA) available for persons with a chronic hepatitis B infection: alpha-interferon, pegylated interferon, adefovir, entecavir, telbivudine, lamivudine, tenofovir disoproxil and tenofovir alafenamide with a 65% rate of sustained response.

=== Hepatitis C ===
Hepatitis C (originally "non-A non-B hepatitis") is caused by hepatitis C virus (HCV), an RNA virus of the family Flaviviridae. HCV can be transmitted through contact with blood (including through sexual contact if the two parties' blood is mixed) and can also cross the placenta. Hepatitis C usually leads to chronic hepatitis, culminating in cirrhosis in some people. It usually remains asymptomatic for decades. Patients with hepatitis C are susceptible to severe hepatitis if they contract either hepatitis A or B, so all persons with hepatitis C should be immunized against hepatitis A and hepatitis B if they are not already immune, and avoid alcohol. HCV can lead to the development of hepatocellular carcinoma, however, only a minority of HCV-infected individuals develop cancer (1–4% annually), suggesting a complex interplay between viral gene expression and host and environmental factors to promote carcinogenesis. The risk is increased two-fold with active HBV coinfection and a 21% increase in mortality compared to those with latent HBV and HCV. HCV viral levels can be reduced to undetectable levels by a combination of interferon and the antiviral drug ribavirin. The genotype of the virus is the primary determinant of the rate of response to this treatment regimen, with genotype 1 being the most resistant.

Hepatitis C is the most common chronic bloodborne infection in the United States, and the leading cause of liver transplants.

Hepatitis C
Marker	Detection Time	Description	Significance	Note
HCV-RNA	1–3 weeks or 21 days	PCR	Demonstrates presence or absence of virus	Results may be intermittent during course of infection. Negative result is not indicative of absence.
anti-HCV	5–6 weeks	Enzyme Immunoassay for antibodies	Demonstrates past or present infection	High false positive in those with autoimmune disorders and populations with low virus prevalence.
ALT	5–6 weeks	–	Peak in ALT coincides with peak in anti-HCV	Fluctuating ALT levels is an indication of active liver disease.

=== Hepatitis D ===
Hepatitis D is caused by the hepatitis D virus (HDV), or hepatitis delta virus; it belongs to the genus Deltavirus. HDV is similar to a satellite virus as it can only propagate in the presence of the hepatitis B virus, depending on the helper function of HBV for its replication and expression. It has no independent life cycle, but can survive and replicate as long as HBV infection persists in the host body. It can only cause infection when encapsulated by hepatitis B virus surface antigens. The vaccine for hepatitis B protects against hepatitis D virus because of the latter's dependence on the presence of hepatitis B virus for it to replicate.

=== Hepatitis E ===
Hepatitis E is caused by the Hepatitis E virus (HEV), from the family Hepeviridae. It produces symptoms similar to hepatitis A, although it can take a fulminant course in some patients, particularly pregnant women (mortality rate about 20%); chronic infections may occur in immune-compromised patients. It is more prevalent in the Indian subcontinent. The virus is feco-orally transmitted and is usually self-limited.

=== Hepatitis F virus ===
Hepatitis F virus (HFV) is a hypothetical virus linked to certain cases of hepatitis. Several hepatitis F virus candidates emerged in the 1990s, but none of these reports have been substantiated.

=== GB virus C ===
The GB virus C is a virus that is probably spread by blood and sexual contact. It was initially identified as Hepatitis G virus. There is very little evidence that this virus causes hepatitis, as it does not appear to replicate primarily in the liver. It is now classified as Pegivirus hominis.

=== 2022 hepatitis of unknown origin ===
In 2022, several hundred cases of acute hepatitis of probable infectious origin were reported worldwide. As of May 2023, the virus causing these cases has not been identified, but an adenovirus is suspected.

== Relationship between hepatitis C virus and liver cancer ==
Hepatitis C virus (HCV) can cause acute and chronic infections that are a major cause of hepatocellular carcinoma (HCC), advanced hepatic fibrosis and cirrhosis.

HCC is a major cause of death in patients with chronic HCV infection. Regarding the pathogenesis of HCC associated with HCV, that virus may play direct or indirect roles.

A major risk for the development of HCC is persistent infection with HCV, and the highest risk for HCC development is associated with co-infection of HBV with HDV, HCV or HIV.

Risk factors that can lead to the development of HCC in those with chronic HCV include synchronous liver diseases, viral genotype, diabetes mellitus, and obesity. Lifestyle factors such as liver steatosis, smoking, and alcohol use can accelerate progression to HCC and liver decompensation in patients with HCV.

The purpose of HCV treatment is to eliminate the infection, reduce the transmission to other people and decrease the risk of HCC development.

== Other viruses ==
The virus first known to cause hepatitis was the yellow fever virus, a mosquito-borne flavivirus. Other viruses than can cause hepatitis include:

- Adenoviruses
- Arenaviruses: Guanarito virus, Junín virus, Lassa fever virus, Lujo virus, Machupo virus, and Sabiá virus
- Bunyaviruses: Crimean–Congo hemorrhagic fever virus, Dobrava virus, Hantaan virus, Puumala virus, Rift Valley fever virus, and Seoul virus
- Coronavirus: severe acute respiratory syndrome virus
- Erythrovirus: Parvovirus B19
- Filoviruses: Ebola virus and Marburg virus
- Flaviviruses: dengue, Kyasanur Forest disease virus, Omsk hemorrhagic fever virus, and yellow fever virus
- Herpesviruses: cytomegalovirus, Epstein–Barr virus, varicella-zoster virus, human herpesvirus 6, human herpesvirus 7, and human herpesvirus 8
- Orthomyxoviruses: influenza
- Picornaviruses: echovirus
- Reovirus: Colorado tick fever virus, reovirus 3

Additionally, a casual role between the virus KIs-V and hepatitis is suspected based on a 2011 study that isolated KIs-V from four patients with raised serum alanine transferases without other known cause.
