= Rustrela virus =

Virus classification
- (unranked): Virus
- Realm: Riboviria
- Kingdom: Orthornavirae
- Phylum: Kitrinoviricota
- Class: Alsuviricetes
- Order: Hepelivirales
- Family: Matonaviridae
- Genus: Rubivirus
- Species: Rubivirus strelense

Synonyms
- Rustrela virus

Species of virus

Rustrela virus, scientific name Rubivirus strelense, is a species of virus in the genus Rubivirus.

== History ==
Scientists discovered Rustrela in acutely encephalitic placental and marsupial mammals – a donkey, a capybara, and a wallaby – in a zoo in Germany, and in wild yellow-necked field mice (Apodemus flavicollis) in and around the zoo. The virus can jump between species and interestingly infects both placental and marsupial animals.

== Structure ==
The Rustrela virus has the same genomic structure as the Rubella virus. Rustrela has a few amino acid differences in the protein which binds to host cells. There are four putative B cell epitopes in the fusion (E1) protein of rustrela that are highly conserved with Rubella virus and Ruhugu virus.
