= Masoud Dara =

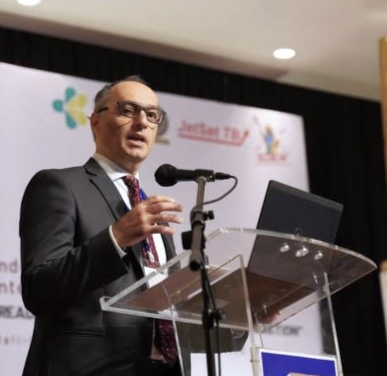
- Occupation: Medical Doctor

Masoud Dara is a Belgian doctor, who works as a senior director at Otsuka Novel Products GmbH. He is also an honorary Senior Lecturer of Wolfson Institute of Population Health at Queen Mary University of London. Dara has authored over 120 peer-reviewed publications.

== Education ==
Dara graduated from Kermanshah Medical University with a medical degree, Radboud University with a PhD, and Queen Mary University of London with a master's degree in global health science. He obtained permission to practice medicine in 1994.

== Career ==
During his early career, he served as a primary health care physician in West of Iran. In Central Asia, he worked for Médecins Sans Frontières from 1998 to 2001, where he implemented tuberculosis (TB) programs. This was his first overseas work experience. From 2001 to 2002, Dara headed the Belgian Red Cross's mission in Kosovo. In 2002, he began working for the World Health Organization in Moscow, the Russian Federation. He oversaw the organization's TB control programs nationwide, including their planning, execution, monitoring, and assessment.

He served as Senior Consultant for the KNCV Tuberculosis Foundation (3), offering strategy, implementation, and evaluation advice to governments on four continents about TB and TB/HIV programs from 2003 to 2010. He then oversaw the HIV, viral hepatitis, and tuberculosis (TB) programs at the WHO Regional Office for Europe from 2011 to 2020. From 2014 to 2016, he also served as the organization's Senior Advisor for communicable diseases and health emergencies to the European Union. Throughout his ten years at the WHO, he oversaw the creation of four disease-specific five-year action plans, raised funds and personnel, and made the plans easier to implement and report on.

Dara has launched a number of initiatives with the help of regional and country office teams, including the European TB Research Initiative, the European Laboratory Initiative on TB, HIV, and viral hepatitis, and the Regional Collaborating Committee on Accelerating Response to TB, HIV, and viral hepatitis. These platforms facilitate the exchange of research scientists, practitioners, community representatives, and health authorities across 53 countries in the WHO European Region. During his term, on July 23, 2018, in the Netherlands, the first Ministerial policy dialogue on HIV and related comorbidities in eastern Europe and central Asia (EECA) was held in conjunction with the Amsterdam AIDS conference. He served as Special Representative of the WHO Regional Director to Belarus from 2020 to 2021.

Dara has been a board member of the AMR Industry Alliance and a member of the supervisory board of AIDS International East West (AFEW) since 2022. Additionally, he has served as an associate editor and member of the editorial board for a number of journals, including the International Journal of Tuberculosis and Lung Diseases, the International Journal of Environmental Research and Public Health, and Eurosurveillance.
