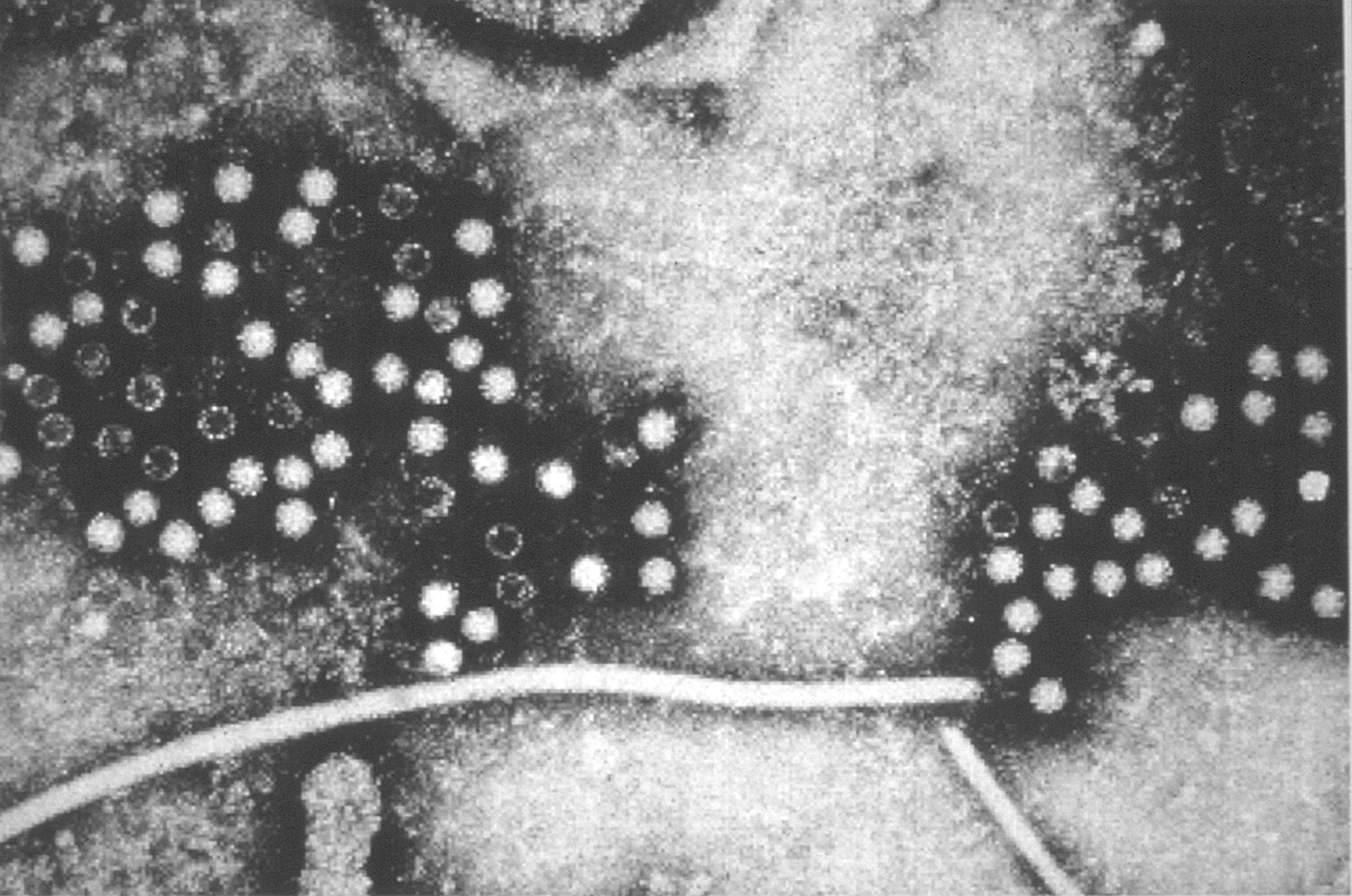
- TEM micrograph of Hepatitis E virus virions

Virus classification
- (unranked): Virus
- Realm: Riboviria
- Kingdom: Orthornavirae
- Phylum: Kitrinoviricota
- Class: Alsuviricetes
- Order: Hepelivirales
- Family: Hepeviridae
- Subfamily: Orthohepevirinae

= Orthohepevirinae =

Subfamily of viruses

Orthohepevirinae is a subfamily of viruses assigned to the family Hepeviridae. Viruses in the subfamily, called orthohepeviruses, have virions that are characterized by round, non-enveloped and isometric capsids with a diameter of 27–34 nm. The hepatitis E virus belongs to this subfamily as the species Paslahepevirus balayani.

== Genome ==
Orthohepeviruses have RNA genomes of 7176 nucleotides in length and infect vertebrates. Additionally, the genome is monopartite, linear, and single-stranded. The genome is 5' capped with a poly A tail at the 3' end. The genome possesses three main open reading frames. The first encodes non-structural proteins, the second encodes the capsid proteins, and the third encodes a small, multifunctional protein.

== Hosts ==
Viruses from this subfamily have been isolated from a variety of mammals (including rodents, mustelids and bats) as well as birds. At least three variants of avian hepatitis E virus have been isolated from birds.

== Evolution ==
One study has suggested that hepeviruses may have originated in birds and then spread to bats and other mammalian species.

== Taxonomy ==
The subfamily contains the following genera:

- Avihepevirus
- Chirohepevirus
- Paslahepevirus, which contains Hepatitis E virus
- Rocahepevirus

== History ==
Hepatitis E was first isolated in 1990. It was thought to be restricted to humans until 1997 when it was isolated from pigs. The first isolation from birds was in 2001.

The subfamily shares the name (Orthohepe-) of the former genus Orthohepevirus. This genus was abolished and orthohepeviruses were promoted to the rank of subfamily in 2022 with the establishment of the subfamily that year.
