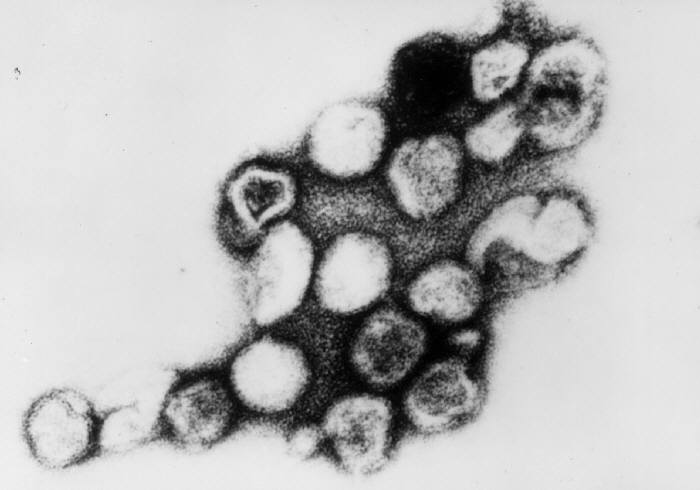
- Transmission electron micrograph of Rubella virus virions

Virus classification
- (unranked): Virus
- Realm: Riboviria
- Kingdom: Orthornavirae
- Phylum: Kitrinoviricota
- Class: Alsuviricetes
- Order: Hepelivirales
- Family: Matonaviridae
- Genus: Rubivirus
- Species: Rubivirus rubellae

= Rubella virus =

Species of virus

Rubella virus (RuV) is the pathogenic agent of the disease rubella, transmitted only between humans via the respiratory route. In infants and adults it generally causes a mild self-limiting disease. However it is the cause of congenital rubella syndrome when infection occurs during the first weeks of pregnancy.

Rubella virus, scientific name Rubivirus rubellae, is a member of the genus Rubivirus and belongs to the family of Matonaviridae, whose members commonly have a genome of single-stranded RNA of positive polarity which is enclosed in a capsid.

== Taxonomy ==
Rubella virus (Rubivirus rubellae) is assigned to Rubivirus, the sole genus in the family Matonaviridae. Previously, were classified in the family Togaviridae but in 2018, they were reclassified by the International Committee on the Taxonomy of Viruses (ICTV), the central governing body for viral classification.

Structure of Rubivirus

Matonaviridae is named after George de Maton, who in 1814 first distinguished rubella from measles and scarlet fever. Characteristics of this family are:

- approximately 10 kb of positive-sense, non-segmented RNA
- virions which vary in shape from spherical to tube-like, 50–90 nm diameter
- a single capsid protein and two envelope glycoproteins

=== Other rubiviruses ===
In 2020, Ruhugu virus (identified in bats) and Rustrela virus (affecting several mammal species) joined Rubella virus as second and third of only three members of the genus Rubivirus. Neither of them are known to infect humans, although genomic similarities suggest that this is possible.

It is possible that RuV may have zoonotic origin, having evolved from a Rubivirus ancestor which spilled over from a non-human mammal host.

== Structure ==
Images of rubella virus

The virus particles (virions) of RuV have a diameter of 50 to 90 nm and are covered by a lipid membrane (viral envelope), derived from the host cell membrane. It has prominent "spikes" (projections) composed of the viral proteins E1 and E2 linked as a heterodimer.

Enclosed within the lipid envelope is a capsid of about 65 nm in diameter. It consists of a protein shell made of capsid protein (C) surrounding the core of viral RNA.

== Genome ==
Rubella virus genome

The positive-strand RNA genome has 9,762 nucleotides. At the 5′-terminal it codes for non-structural proteins (p150 and p90), occupying approximately two-thirds of the genome. 3 structural proteins (CP, E2, and E1) at the other end of the strand (3′-terminal) occupy the remainder.

== Proteins ==
The 5 viral proteins have the following functions:

- The capsid protein (CP) has several functions. Within the host cell, it interacts with the nonstructural proteins to regulate viral RNA transcription. As the infection proceeds, it binds newly formed viral RNA, with multiple units of CP linking together as homo-oligomeres surrounding the RNA to form the capsid. It associates with the E2 protein at the cell membrane, culminating in the assembly of mature virions which bud off from the host cell.
- The E1 protein binds and fuses the virion with host cell; it is also the principal antigen which is targeted by the immune response.
- The E2 protein forms a dimer with E1; within the host cell it enables E2 to be incorporated into the nascent virion. Together E1 and E2 form the viral spike.
- P150 forms a dimer with P90.
- P90 is an RNA-dependent RNA polymerase (RdRp), associated as a dimer with P150. Together they replicate viral DNA in order to generate new virions.

== Replication ==
The E1 spike protein of the virion attaches to receptors on the host cell surface, forming an endosome which is taken into the host cell. (Note: As of 2026, myelin oligodendrocyte glycoprotein (MOG) and Nectin-4 are considered to be possible receptor targets.) At a lower pH inside the cell, the viral envelope fuses with the endosomal membrane, releasing the capsid into the cytoplasm, where it decays and releases the genome.

The viral +ssRNA (positive, single-stranded RNA) is immediately processed by the host cell's ribosomes into proteins. Initially this templates translation of the non-structural proteins from the 5'-terminal, synthesized as a single large polyprotein which is cut into the P90 and P150 proteins. These reconfigure to form the RdRp. The RdRp complex generates (via a negative -ssRNA template) new complete copies of the viral +ssRNA as well as a separate short mRNA coding for structural proteins (CP, E1, E2) which is derived from the 3'-terminal sequence of the genome.

The E1 and E2 structural proteins link to form a dimer. Units of CP encapsulate a viral +ssRNA strand to form the nucleocapsid. Both the E1/E2 dimer and the nucleocapsid migrate to the Golgi apparatus where they assemble to form new virions, which then bud off from the cell membrane.

== Pathophysiology ==
The rubella virus is spread by inhalation of respiratory droplets exhaled or coughed from an infected person. The virus initially infects cells in the lining of the nose and pharynx, and spreads after a few days to the lymph nodes. The incubation period is between 12 and 23 days before symptoms appear; individuals are infectious between 8 days before to 8 days after the appearance of symptoms.

From the lymph nodes, the virus spreads via the bloodstream, infecting multiple organs. Particularly, it causes a rash on the skin and pain in the joints. Symptoms are generally mild and resolve within a few days. Some infections can be asymptomatic.

Rarely, rubella can lead to encephalitis or long term pain and swelling of the joints.

=== Congenital rubella syndrome ===
The most serious complication of rubella is when the infection occurs during early pregnancy. Virus in the bloodstream of the mother enters and crosses the placenta, infecting the developing fetus. This hinders development leading potentially to low birthweight, deafness, visual impairment, heart disease and neurological complications.

== Transmission ==
RuV is transmitted by inhalation of respiratory droplets from an infected person. It then replicates in the nasopharynx and lymph nodes.

== Epidemiology ==
Since the introduction of vaccination campaigns, rubella incidence has declined. 670,894 cases were recorded in the year 2000; this reduced to 17,865 in 2022. The WHO Region of the Americas has free of endemic transmission of rubella since 2015. Endemic transmission continues in other regions, especially in parts of Africa and South-East Asia where vaccination coverage is low.

Rubella has a single serotype, so that acquired immunity is effective against all strains of the virus. There are two clades of the virus, distinguished by analysis of 739 nucleotides in the E1 coding region. These have been subdivided into 10 genotypes of clade 1 (1a, 1B, 1C, 1D, 1E, 1F, 1G, 1h, 1i, 1j), and 3 genotypes of clade 2 (2A, 2B and 2C). Four of these genotypes (1D, 1F, 1i, and 2A) have not been detected for over 10 years and may be extinct.

== Literature ==
- David M. Knipe, Peter M. Howley et al. (eds.): Fields Virology 4. Auflage, Philadelphia 2001
- C.M. Fauquet, M.A. Mayo et al.: Eighth Report of the International Committee on Taxonomy of Viruses, London San Diego 2005
