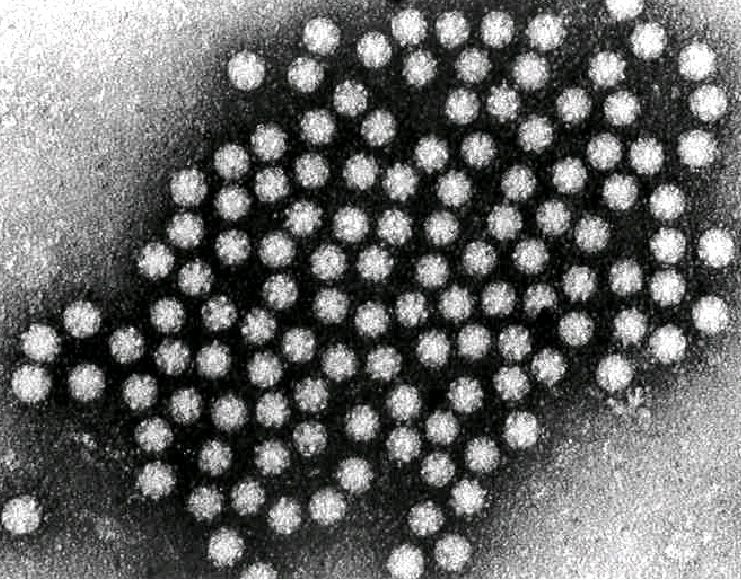

Virus classification
- (unranked): Virus
- Realm: Riboviria
- Kingdom: Orthornavirae
- Phylum: Pisuviricota
- Class: Stelpaviricetes
- Order: Stellavirales
- Family: Astroviridae
- Genus: Avastrovirus

= Avastrovirus =

Genus of viruses

Avastrovirus is a genus of viruses, in the family Astroviridae. Birds serve as natural hosts. There are three species in this genus. Diseases associated with this genus include: gastroenteritis, liver or kidney damages.

== Taxonomy ==
The genus contains the following species:

- Avastrovirus 1
- Avastrovirus 2
- Avastrovirus 3

== Structure ==
Viruses in Avastrovirus are non-enveloped, with icosahedral and spherical geometries, and T=3 symmetry. The diameter is around 35 nm. Genomes are linear and non-segmented, around 6.8-7kb in length.

Genus	Structure	Symmetry	Capsid	Genomic arrangement	Genomic segmentation
Avastrovirus	Icosahedral	T=3	Non-enveloped	Linear	Monopartite

== Life cycle ==
Viral replication is cytoplasmic. Entry into the host cell is achieved by attachment to host receptors, which mediates endocytosis. Replication follows the positive stranded RNA virus replication model. Positive stranded RNA virus transcription, using an unknown model of subgenomic RNA transcription is the method of transcription. Translation takes place by -1 ribosomal frameshifting. Birds serve as the natural host. Transmission routes are fecal-oral.

Genus	Host details	Tissue tropism	Entry details	Release details	Replication site	Assembly site	Transmission
Avastrovirus	Birds	Enterocytes	Cell receptor endocytosis	Budding	Cytoplasm	Cytoplasm	Oral-fecal
