= Avastrovirus 2 =

Virus classification
- (unranked): Virus
- Realm: Riboviria
- Kingdom: Orthornavirae
- Phylum: Pisuviricota
- Class: Stelpaviricetes
- Order: Stellavirales
- Family: Astroviridae
- Genus: Avastrovirus
- Species: Avastrovirus 2

Synonyms
- Avian nephritis virus; Chicken astrovirus

Species of virus

Avastrovirus 2, also called avian nephritis virus, is an astrovirus which causes 'avian nephritis' in chickens.

Causes: Infectious Stunting Syndrome — ISS — Baby Chick Nephritis — BCN.

The virus has been reported in Japan, Europe, USA and New Zealand. The disease is mainly transmitted horizontally by the oro-faecal route, but rarely vertical transmission may occur.

Clinical signs of the disease are normally only seen in chicks less than two weeks old, and these signs should be mild unless the chick is immunosuppressed.

== Clinical signs and diagnosis ==
In mild cases diarrhea, stunted growth and skin lesions are the common clinical signs.

Clinical signs are more severe in immunosuppressed, under-nourished or stressed chicks, with infection causing nephrosis, emaciation and even sudden death.

On postmortem examination nephritis with accumulation of uric acid (gout) and enteritis are commonly present.

A presumptive diagnosis may be based on clinical signs. For definitive diagnosis the virus or viral antigens must be demonstrated in the affected tissue(s). Diagnostic techniques used are virus neutralisation, ELISA, immunofluorescence and RT-PCR.

== Treatment and control ==
There is currently no effective treatment for avian nephritis. Hygiene measures such as the use of an "all-in-all-out" policy and thorough disinfection of housing between batches should be employed to control disease. Adequate nutrition and a stress-free environment should decrease the amount of clinical disease seen in flocks.

== Bibliography ==
- Avian Nephritis, reviewed and published by WikiVet at Avian Nephritis - WikiVet English, accessed 16/08/2011.
