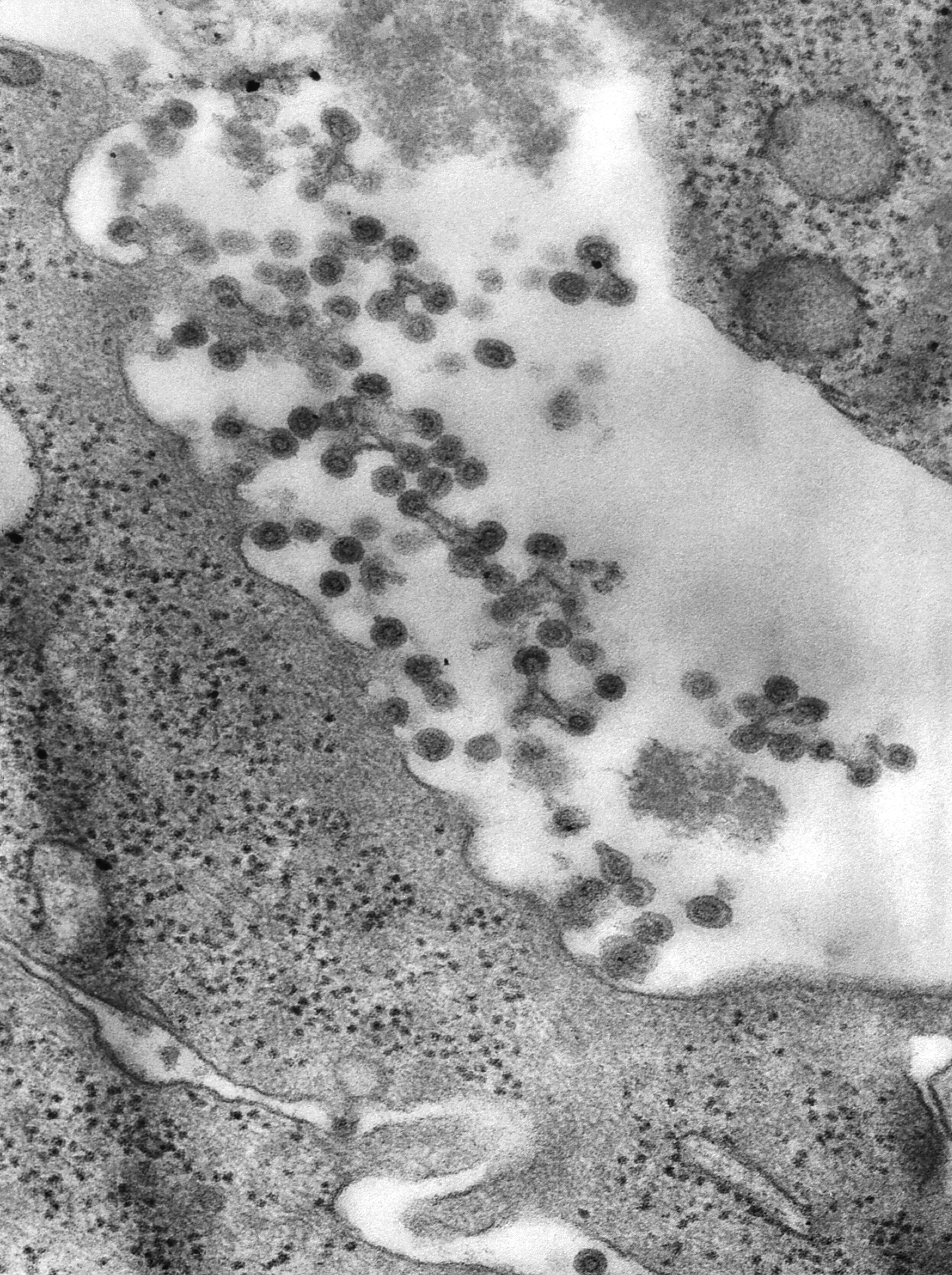
- This negatively-stained transmission electron micrograph (TEM) revealed the presence of Rubivirus rubellae virions

Virus classification
- (unranked): Virus
- Realm: Riboviria
- Kingdom: Orthornavirae
- Phylum: Kitrinoviricota
- Class: Alsuviricetes
- Order: Hepelivirales
- Family: Matonaviridae
- Genus: Rubivirus

= Rubivirus =

Genus of viruses

Rubivirus is a genus of viruses. It contains three species.

== Taxonomy ==
The following three species are assigned to the genus:

- Rubivirus rubellae, commonly called rubella virus
- Rubivirus ruteetense, commonly called ruhugu virus
- Rubivirus strelense, commonly called rustrela virus
