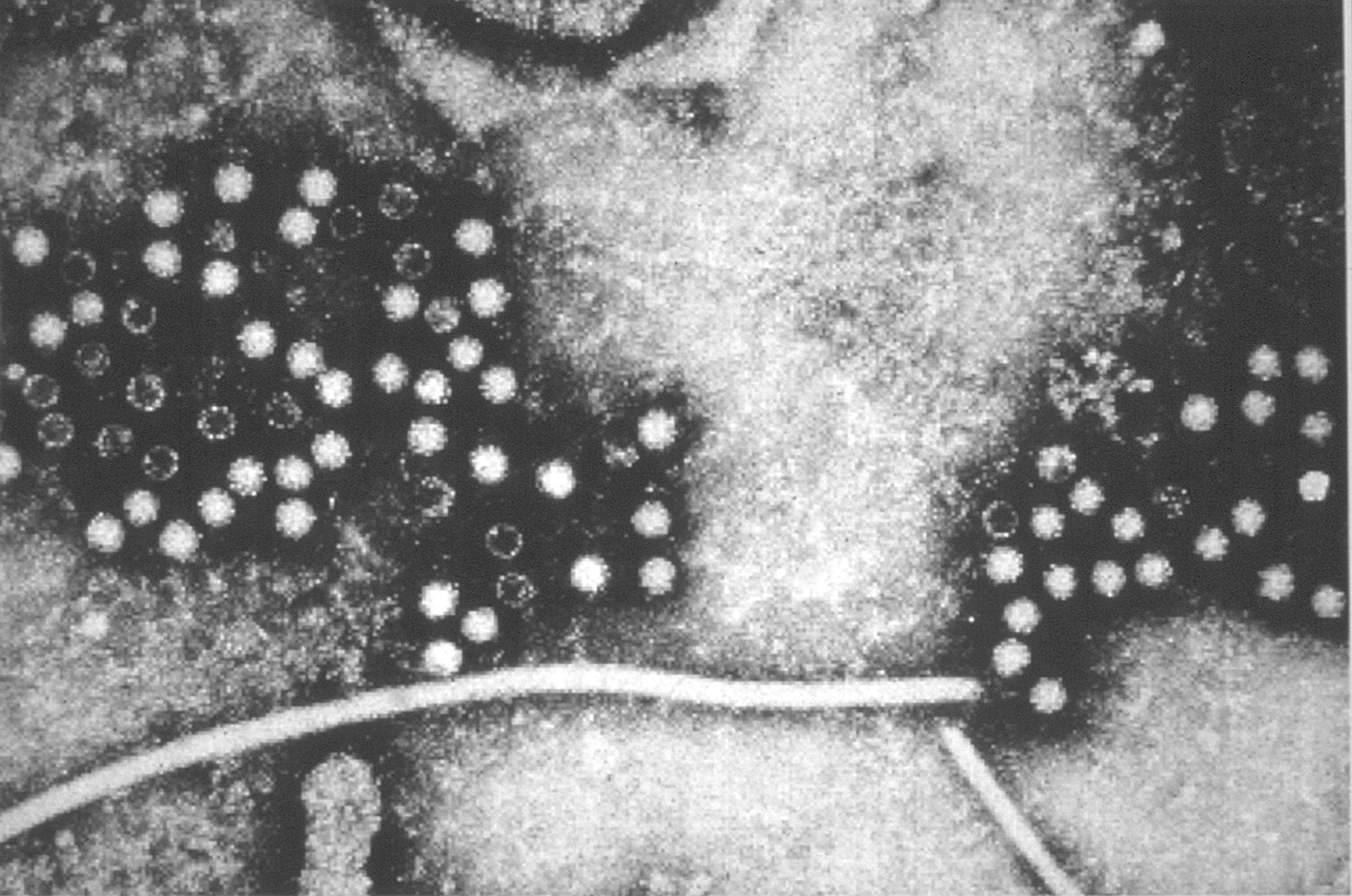
- TEM micrograph of Hepatitis E virus virions

Virus classification
- (unranked): Virus
- Realm: Riboviria
- Kingdom: Orthornavirae
- Phylum: Kitrinoviricota
- Class: Alsuviricetes
- Order: Hepelivirales
- Family: Hepeviridae
- Genus: Paslahepevirus
- Species: Paslahepevirus balayani

Synonyms
- Hepatitis E virus; Orthohepevirus A

= Hepatitis E virus =

Species of virus

Hepatitis E virus (HEV) is the causative agent of hepatitis E.

Globally, approximately 939 million corresponding to 1 in 8 individuals have ever experienced HEV infection. About 15–110 million individuals have recent or ongoing HEV infection. The virus particle was first seen in 1983, but was only molecularly cloned in 1989.

== Genome and proteome ==
Hepatitis E virus can be classified into eight different genotypes from different geographical regions: genotype 1 (Asia), genotype 2 (Africa and Mexico), genotype 3 (Europe and North America), genotype 4 (Asia); genotypes 5 and 6 have been detected in Asian wild boar and genotypes 7 and 8 in camels.

The viral genome is a single strand of positive-sense RNA that is about 7200 bases in length. The three open reading frames (ORF1, ORF2 and ORF3) encode for three proteins (O1, O2, O3), two of which are polyproteins, that is, they are cleaved into fragments which carry out the actual functions of the virus (see figure). The O1 protein consists of seven such fragments, namely Met (methyltransferase), Y (Y-domain), Plp (papain-like protease), V (proline-rich variable region), X (X-domain, macro-domain), Hel (helicase), and Rdrp (RNA-dependent RNA polymerase). The Pvx domain is a fusion protein consisting of the Plp, V, and X domains. The O3 protein is encoded by a single open-reading frame (ORF3). The O2 protein encodes the capsid, which is composed of three domains, namely the shell domain (S) and two protruding domains (P1, P2). Numbers in the figure indicate positions in the RNA sequence.

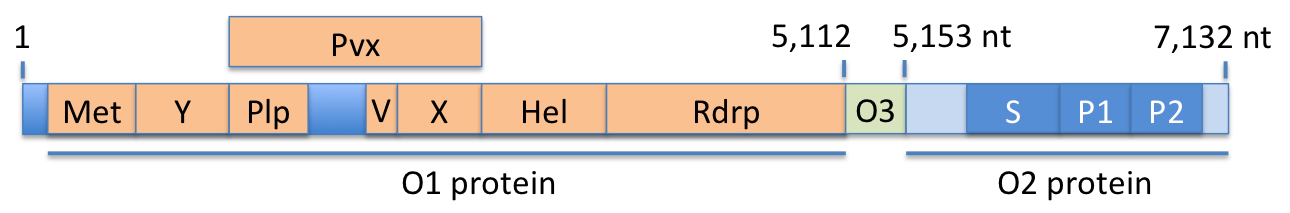

=== Interactome ===
The protein-protein interactome among HEV proteins has been mapped by Osterman et al. (2015), who found 25 interactions among the 10 proteins studied. Almost all (24) of these interactions were considered as of "high quality".

== Structure ==
The viral particles are 27 to 34 nanometers in diameter and are not enveloped. Although not enveloped, it does have a isosahedral shaped capsid to ensure protection of its RNA genome, and additionally playing a role in the virus's attachment and entry into the host.

== Taxonomy ==
It was previously classified in the family Caliciviridae. However, its genome more closely resembles rubella virus. It is now classified as a member of the genus Paslahepevirus in the family Hepeviridae.

== Evolution ==
The strains of HEV that exist today may have arisen from a shared ancestor virus 536 to 1344 years ago. Another analysis has dated the origin of Hepatitis E to ~6000 years ago, with a suggestion that this was associated with domestication of pigs. At some point, two clades may have diverged—an anthropotropic form and an enzootic form—which subsequently evolved into genotypes 1 and 2 and genotypes 3 and 4, respectively.

Whereas genotype 2 remains less commonly detected than other genotypes, genetic evolutionary analyses suggest that genotypes 1, 3, and 4 have spread substantially during the past 100 years.

== See also ==
- Hepatitis A
- Hepatitis B (Hepatitis B virus)
- Hepatitis C (Hepatitis C virus)
- Hepatitis D
- Hepatitis E
