= Ruhugu virus =

Virus classification
- (unranked): Virus
- Realm: Riboviria
- Kingdom: Orthornavirae
- Phylum: Kitrinoviricota
- Class: Alsuviricetes
- Order: Hepelivirales
- Family: Matonaviridae
- Genus: Rubivirus
- Species: Rubivirus ruteetense

Synonyms
- Ruhugu virus

Species of virus

The Ruhugu virus, scientifically known as Rubivirus ruteetense, is a type of virus that falls under the Rubivirus genus. It was first identified in 2019 within unaffected bats from Uganda. This virus is classified within the Matonaviridae family and consists of a single-stranded RNA with a positive polarity. It is encapsulated by an icosahedral capsid.

== Discovery and habitat ==
Before the onset of the COVID-19 pandemic, the Ruhugu virus was detected in disease-free Cyclops roundleaf bats residing in Kibale National Park, Uganda. This discovery was made during a search for coronaviruses present in bat populations.

== Etymology ==
Ruhugu virus was named after the Ruteete region of Uganda and the word in the local Tooro language, which describes "the flapping of bat wings in the hollow of a tree: obuhuguhugu"

== Structure ==
Ruhugu virus is closely related to Rubella virus and differs in only one amino acid in the protein it uses to get into host cells. In the fusion protein of the virus and two putative T cell epitopes in the capsid protein of the ruhugu virus the amino acid sequences of four putative B cell epitopes are moderately to highly conserved, suggesting ruhugu viruses have a similar capacity for fusion with the host-cell membrane like rubella virus.
