= Xiamen Innovax Biotech =

Chinese pharmaceutical company

Xiamen Innovax Biotech CO., LTD. (Innovax) is a Chinese company that manufactures, markets, and develops vaccines. It is headquartered in Xiamen, Fujian, China.

== Hepatitis E Vaccine (HEV 239) ==
In October 2012, Xiamen created the HEV 239 vaccine to treat Hepatitis E. The vaccine was approved by the Chinese Ministry of Science and Technology after it was tested during a controlled trial of 100,000+ people from the Jiangsu Province over a 12-month period. Of the 100,000 people treated, none were infected as compared to 15 that were infected from the controlled placebo group.

== Other vaccines ==
The firm also has created a cervical cancer vaccine that is currently under a phase III clinical trial, a genital warts vaccine that is under a phase II clinical trial, and a 9-valent HPV vaccine currently in the process of receiving clinical approval.

== WHO position on HEV 239 ==
The World Health Organization (WHO) stated that the Phase I, II, and III clinical trials were effective and safe in healthy subjects, however the WHO has not made a recommendation regarding the HEV 239 Vaccine because of a lack of evidence in people 16 years of age or younger, and 65 years of age and older. China is currently the only country to approve the vaccine since Hepatitis E is rare in developed countries. There are further clinical trials planned before making the drug more generally available. to susceptible populations. The position of the WHO is that, however, national authorities may decide to use the vaccine based on the local epidemiology.
