= KIs-V =

DNA virus

KIs-V is a DNA virus isolated from four human cases of acute hepatitis in Japan. This virus has also been isolated in France.

== Virology ==
The genome has a sequence of 9496 bases and 13 potential genes. The virus is 30–50 nanometers in diameter and is enveloped.
