= Hepatitis E =

Human disease caused by Orthohepevirus A

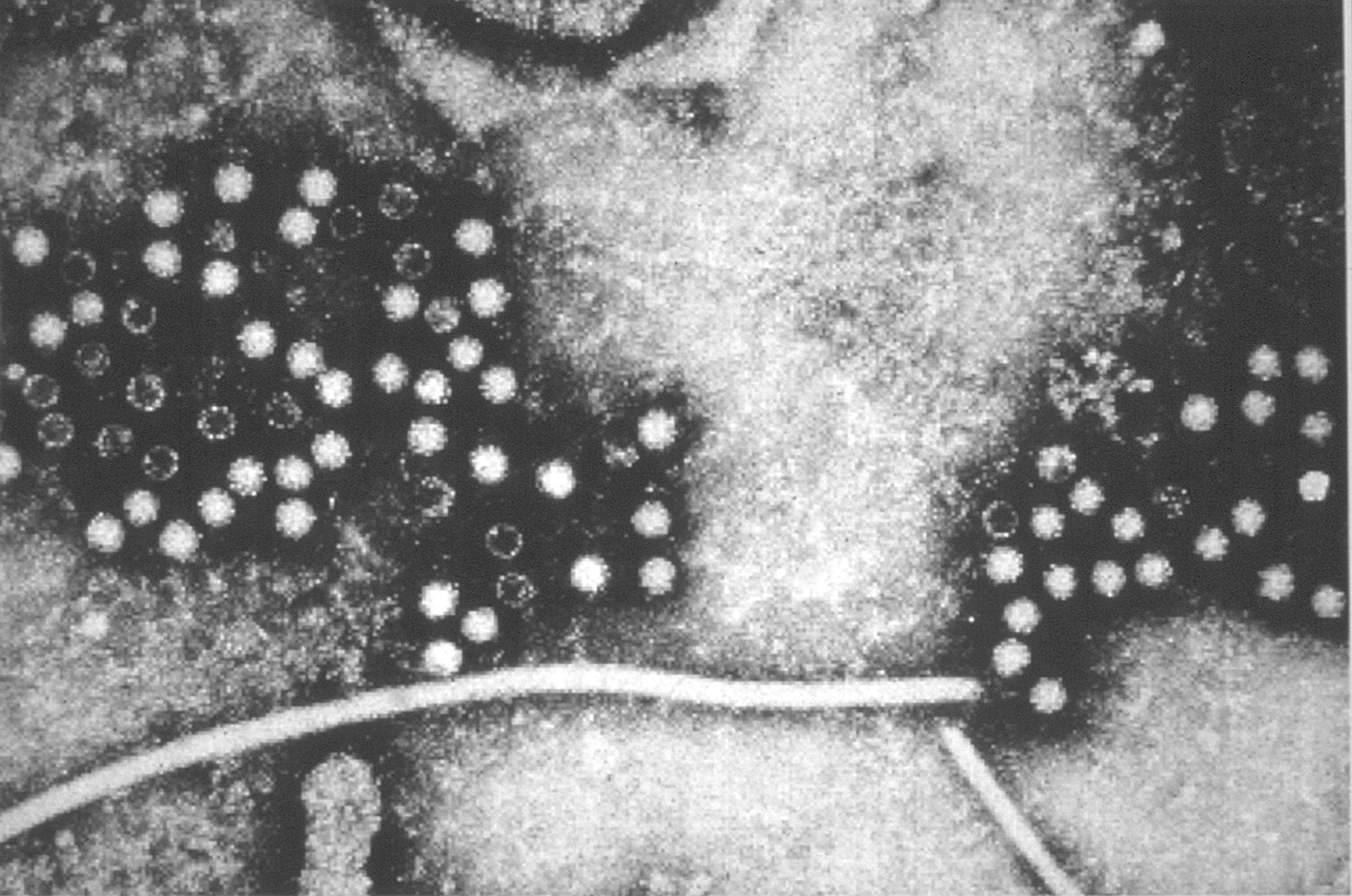
- Hepatitis E virus
- Specialty: Infectious disease, hepatology
- Symptoms: Nausea, jaundice
- Complications: Liver failure
- Causes: Hepatitis E virus (HEV)
- Diagnostic method: Blood test
- Differential diagnosis: Hepatitis A
- Treatment: Rest, ribavirin (if chronic)
- Frequency: 28 million worldwide (2013)

Hepatitis E is inflammation of the liver caused by infection with the hepatitis E virus (HEV); it is a type of viral hepatitis. Hepatitis E has mainly a fecal-oral transmission route that is similar to hepatitis A, although the viruses are unrelated. HEV is a positive-sense, single-stranded, nonenveloped, RNA icosahedral virus and one of five known human hepatitis viruses: A, B, C, D, and E.

Like hepatitis A, hepatitis E usually follows an acute and self-limiting course of illness (the condition is temporary and the individual recovers) with low death rates in resource-rich areas; however, it can be more severe in pregnant women and people with a weakened immune system, with substantially higher death rates. In pregnant women, especially in the third trimester, the disease is more often severe and is associated with a clinical syndrome called fulminant liver failure, with death rates around 20%. Whereas pregnant women may have a rapid and severe course, organ transplant recipients who receive medications to weaken the immune system and prevent organ rejection can develop a slower and more persistent form called chronic hepatitis E, which is so diagnosed after 3 months of continuous viremia. HEV can be clustered genetically into 8 genotypes, and genotypes 3 and 4 tend to be the ones that cause chronic hepatitis in the immunosuppressed.

In 2017, hepatitis E was estimated to affect more than 19 million people. Those most commonly at risk of HEV are men aged 15 to 35 years of age. A preventive vaccine (HEV 239) is approved for use in China.

The virus was discovered in 1983 by researchers investigating an outbreak of unexplained hepatitis among Soviet soldiers serving in Afghanistan. The Russian virologist Mikhail S. Balayan discovered the virus after he ingested fecal samples of 9 soldiers mixed with kefir. The earliest well-documented epidemic of hepatitis E occurred in 1955 in New Delhi and affected tens of thousands of people (hepatitis E virus was identified as the etiological agent at fault retrospectively through testing of stored samples).

== Signs and symptoms ==
=== Acute infection ===
The average incubation period of hepatitis E is 40 days, ranging from 2 to 8 weeks. After a short prodromal phase symptoms may include jaundice, fatigue, and nausea, though most HEV infections are asymptomatic. The symptomatic phase coincides with elevated hepatic aminotransferase levels. Viral RNA becomes detectable in stool and blood serum during the incubation period. Serum IgM and IgG antibodies against HEV appear just before the onset of clinical symptoms. Recovery leads to virus clearance from the blood, while the virus may persist in stool for much longer. Recovery is also marked by disappearance of IgM antibodies and increase of levels of IgG antibodies.

=== Chronic infection ===
While usually lasting weeks and then resolving, in people with weakened immune systems—particularly in people who have had solid organ transplant—hepatitis E may cause a chronic infection. Occasionally this may result in a life-threatening illness such as fulminant liver failure or liver cirrhosis.

=== Other organs ===
Infection with hepatitis E virus can also lead to problems in other organs. For some of these reported conditions such as musculoskeletal or immune-mediated manifestations the relationship is not entirely clear, but for several neurological and blood conditions the relationship appears more consistent:

- Acute pancreatitis (HEV genotype 1)
- Neurological complications (though the mechanism of neurological damage is unknown at this point.) include: Guillain-Barré syndrome (acute limb weakness due to nerve involvement), neuralgic amyotrophy (arm and shoulder weakness, also known as Parsonage-Turner syndrome), acute transverse myelitis and acute meningoencephalitis.
- Glomerulonephritis with nephrotic syndrome and/or cryoglobulinemia
- Mixed cryoglobulinemia, where antibodies in the bloodstream react inappropriately at low temperatures
- Severe thrombocytopenia (low platelet count in the blood) which confers an increased risk of dangerous bleeding

=== Infection in pregnancy ===
Pregnant women show a more severe course of infection than other populations. Liver failure with mortality rates of 20% to 25% has been reported from outbreaks of genotype 1 and 2 HEV in developing countries. Besides signs of an acute infections, adverse effects on the mother and fetus may include preterm delivery, abortion, stillbirth, and neonatal death.

The pathological and biological mechanisms behind the adverse outcomes of pregnancy infections remain largely unclear. Increased viral replication and influence of hormonal changes on the immune system are currently thought to contribute to worsening the course of infection. Furthermore, studies showing evidence for viral replication in the placenta or reporting the full viral life cycle in placental-derived cells in vitro suggest that the human placenta may be a site of viral replication outside the liver. The primary reason for HEV severity in pregnancy remains enigmatic.

== Virology ==
=== Classification ===
HEV is classified into the family Hepeviridae, which is divided in two genera, Orthohepevirus (all mammalian and avian HEV isolates) and Piscihepevirus (cutthroat trout HEV). Only one serotype of the human virus is known, and classification is based on the nucleotide sequences of the genome. Genotype 1 can be further subclassified into five subtypes, genotype 2 into two subtypes, and genotypes 3 and 4 have been divided into 10 and seven subtypes. Additionally there are genotypes 5, 6, 7 and 8. Rat HEV was first isolated from Norway rats in Germany, and a 2018 CDC article indicated the detection of rat HEV RNA in a transplant recipient.

==== Distribution ====
- Genotype 1 has been isolated from tropical and several subtropical countries in Asia and Africa.
- Genotype 2 has been isolated from Mexico, Nigeria, and Chad.
- Genotype 3 has been isolated almost worldwide including Asia, Europe, Oceania, and North and South America.
- Genotype 4 appears to be limited to Asia and indigenous cases from Europe.

Genotypes 1 and 2 are restricted to humans and often associated with large outbreaks and epidemics in developing countries with poor sanitation conditions. Genotypes 3 and 4 infect humans, pigs, and other animal species and have been responsible for sporadic cases of hepatitis E in both developing and industrialized countries.

=== Transmission ===
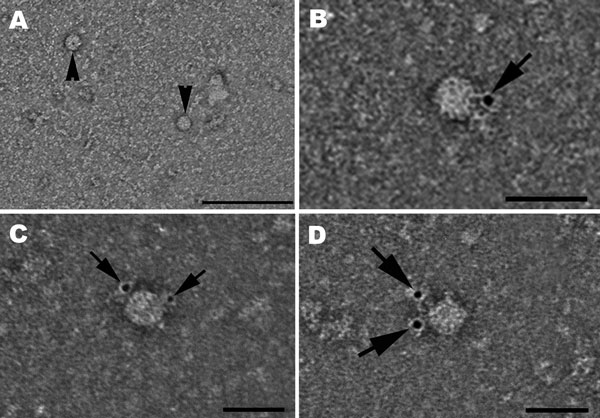
Hepatitis E virus in pork liver sausage (the arrows in panel A point to the virion, those in B, C & D point to bound gold nanoparticles used in virus detection)

Hepatitis E (genotype 1 and, to a lesser extent genotype 2) is endemic and can cause outbreaks in Southeast Asia, northern and central Africa, India, and Central America. It is spread mainly by the fecal–oral route due to contamination of water supplies or food; direct person-to-person transmission is uncommon. In contrast to genotypes 1 and 2, genotypes 3 and 4 cause sporadic cases thought to be contracted zoonotically, from direct contact with animals or indirectly from contaminated water or undercooked meat.

Outbreaks of epidemic hepatitis E most commonly occur after heavy rainfalls, especially monsoons because of their disruption of water supplies; heavy flooding can causes sewage to contaminate water supplies. The World Health Organization recommendation for chlorine on HEV inactivation, a free chlorine residual of 0.5 mg/L (6.7×10^{−5} oz/US gal) for 30 min (pH, <8.0) Major outbreaks have occurred in New Delhi, India (30,000 cases in 1955–1956), Burma (20,000 cases in 1976–1977), Kashmir, India (52,000 cases in 1978), Kanpur, India (79,000 cases in 1991), and China (100,000 cases between 1986 and 1988). According to Rein et al., HEV genotypes 1 and 2 caused some 20.1 million hepatitis E infections, along with 3.4 million cases of symptomatic disease, and 70,000 deaths in 2005; however, the aforementioned paper did not estimate the burden of genotypes 3 and 4.

According to the Department for Environment, Food and Rural Affairs, evidence indicated the increase in hepatitis E in the UK was due to food-borne zoonoses, citing a study that found in the UK that 10% of pork sausages contained the hepatitis E virus. Some research suggests that food must reach a temperature of 70 °C (158 °F) for 20 minutes to eliminate the risk of infection. The Animal Health and Veterinary Laboratories Agency discovered hepatitis E in almost half of all pigs in Scotland.

Hepatitis E infection appeared to be more common in people on hemodialysis, although the specific risk factors for transmission are not clear.

=== Animal reservoir ===
Hepatitis E due to genotypes other than 1 and 2 is thought to be a zoonosis, in that animals are thought to be the primary reservoir; deer and swine have frequently been implicated. Domestic animals have been reported as a reservoir for the hepatitis E virus, with some surveys showing infection rates exceeding 95% among domestic pigs. Replicative virus has been found in the small intestine, lymph nodes, colon, and liver of experimentally infected pigs. Transmission after consumption of wild boar meat and uncooked deer meat has been reported as well. The rate of transmission to humans by this route and the public health importance of this are, however, still unclear. Other animal reservoirs are possible but unknown at this time.

A number of other small mammals have been identified as potential reservoirs: the lesser bandicoot rat (Bandicota bengalensis), the black rat (Rattus rattus brunneusculus) and the Asian house shrew (Suncus murinus). A new virus designated rat hepatitis E virus has been isolated.

=== Genomics ===
HEV has three open reading frames (ORFs) encoding two polyproteins (O1 and O2 protein). ORF2 encodes three capsid proteins whereas O1 encodes seven fragments involved in viral replication, among others.

The smallest ORF of the HEV genome, ORF3 is translated from a subgenomic RNA into O3, a protein of 113–115 amino acids. ORF3 is proposed to play critical roles in immune evasion by HEV. Previous studies showed that ORF3 is bound to viral particles found in patient sera and produced in cell culture. Although in cultured cells ORF3 has not appeared essential for HEV RNA replication, viral assembly, or infection, it is required for particle release.

Geldanamycin

=== Virus lifecycle ===
The lifecycle of hepatitis E virus is unknown; the capsid protein obtains viral entry by binding to a cellular receptor. ORF2 (c-terminal) moderates viral entry by binding to HSC70.

Geldanamycin blocks the transport of HEV239 capsid protein, but not the binding/entry of the truncated capsid protein, which indicates that Hsp90 plays an important part in HEV transport.

== Diagnosis ==
In terms of the diagnosis of hepatitis E, only a laboratory blood test that confirms the presence of HEV RNA or IgM antibodies to HEV can be trusted. In the United States no serologic tests for diagnosis of HEV infection have ever been authorized by the Food and Drug Administration. The World Health Organization has developed an international standard strain for detection and quantification of HEV RNA. In acute infection the viremic window for detection of HEV RNA closes 3 weeks after symptoms begin.

=== Virological markers ===
Assuming that vaccination has not occurred, tests may show:

- if the person's immune system is normal, then
  - if IgM anti-HEV is negative, then there is no evidence of recent HEV infection
  - if IgM anti-HEV is positive, then the person is likely to have a recent or current HEV infection
- if the person's immune system is weakened by disease or medical treatment, as in the case of a person who has received a solid organ transplant, then
  - if IgM anti-HEV is negative, then if additional blood testing reveals
    - positive HEV RNA then the person has HEV infection
    - negative HEV RNA then there is no evidence of current or recent infection
  - if IgM anti-HEV is positive, then the person is likely to have a recent or current HEV infection, and HEV RNA may be useful to track resolution

== Prevention ==
=== Sanitation ===
Sanitation is the most important measure in prevention of hepatitis E; this consists of proper treatment and disposal of human waste, higher standards for public water supplies, improved personal hygiene procedures, and sanitary food preparation. Thus, prevention strategies of this disease are similar to those of many other diseases that plague developing nations. Cooking meat at 71 °C (159.8 °F) for five minutes kills the hepatitis E virus; different temperatures means different time to inactivate the virus.

=== Blood products ===
The amount of virus present in blood products required to cause transfusion-transmitted infection (TTI) appears variable. Transfusion transmission of hepatitis E virus can be screened via minipool HEV NAT (Nucleic acid testing) screening. NAT is a technique used to screen blood molecularly, when blood donations are received; it screens for TTI.

=== Vaccines ===
A vaccine based on recombinant viral proteins was developed in the 1990s and tested in a high-risk population (in Nepal) in 2001. The vaccine appeared to be effective and safe, but development was stopped for lack of profitability, since hepatitis E is rare in developed countries. No hepatitis E vaccine is licensed for use in the United States.

The exception is China; after more than a year of scrutiny and inspection by China's State Food and Drug Administration (SFDA), a hepatitis E vaccine developed by Chinese scientists was available at the end of 2012. The vaccine—called HEV 239 by its developer Xiamen Innovax Biotech—was approved for prevention of hepatitis E in 2012 by the Chinese Ministry of Science and Technology, following a controlled trial on 100,000+ people from Jiangsu Province in which none of those vaccinated became infected during a 12-month period, compared to 15 in the group given placebo. The first vaccine batches came out of Innovax's factory in late October 2012, to be sold to Chinese distributors.

Due to lack of evidence, the World Health Organization has not made a recommendation regarding routine use of the HEV 239 vaccine as of 2015. Its 2015 position was that national authorities may decide to use the vaccine based on their local epidemiology.

It is on the World Health Organization's List of Essential Medicines.

== Treatment ==
There is no drug that has established safety and effectiveness for hepatitis E, and there have been no large randomized clinical trials of antiviral drugs. Reviews of existing small studies suggest that ribavirin can be considered effective in immunocompromised people who have developed chronic infection.

Chronic HEV infection is associated with immunosuppressive therapies, and when that happens in individuals with solid-organ transplantation, reducing immunosuppressive medications can result in clearance of HEV in one third of patients.

== Epidemiology ==
The hepatitis E virus causes around 20 million infections a year. These result in around three million acute illnesses and resulted in 44,000 deaths during 2015. Pregnant women are particularly at risk of complications due to HEV infection, who can develop an acute form of the disease that is fatal in 30% of cases or more. HEV is a major cause of illness and of death in the developing world and disproportionate cause of deaths among pregnant women. Hepatitis E is endemic in Central Asia, while Central America and the Middle East have reported outbreaks. Increasingly, hepatitis E is being seen in developed nations, with reports in 2015 of 848 cases of hepatitis E virus infection in England and Wales.

=== Recent outbreaks ===
In October 2007, an epidemic of hepatitis E occurred in Kitgum District of northern Uganda. This outbreak progressed to become one of the largest known hepatitis E outbreaks in the world. By June 2009, it had resulted in illness in 10,196 persons and 160 deaths. The aforementioned outbreak occurred despite no previous epidemics having been documented in the country, women were the most affected by HEV.

Namibia, Africa

In July 2012, an outbreak was reported in South Sudanese refugee camps in Maban County near the Sudan border. South Sudan's Ministry of Health reported over 400 cases and 16 fatalities as of 13 September 2012. Progressing further, as of 2 February 2013, 88 died due to the outbreak. The medical charity Medecins Sans Frontieres said it treated almost 4000 people. In April 2014, an outbreak in the Biratnagar Municipality of Nepal resulted in infection of over 6000 locals and at least 9 dead.

During an outbreak in Namibia, the number of affected people rose from 490 in January 2018, to 5014 (with 42 deaths) by April 2019, to 6151 cases (with 56 deaths) by August 2019; the WHO estimated that the case fatality rate was 0.9%.

In Hong Kong in May 2020, there were at least 10 cases of hepatitis E that were transmitted by rats, and possibly hundreds of cases that had a transmission mechanism that is not fully understood.

2024 outbreak in Finland. A record number of hepatitis E cases have been diagnosed in Finland so far this year, according to figures released on Tuesday by public health authority THL. Data from the authority's Infectious Diseases Register showed that a total of 92 lab-confirmed infections have been recorded since the beginning of January until 12 March, with 42 people requiring hospital treatment. The outbreak has been suspected to be caused by a batch of mettwurst that has been recalled.

== Evolution ==
The strains of HEV that exist today may have arisen from a shared ancestor virus 536 to 1344 years ago. Another analysis has dated the origin of Hepatitis E to ~6000 years ago, with a suggestion that this was associated with domestication of pigs. At some point, two clades may have diverged — an anthropotropic form and an enzootic form — which subsequently evolved into genotypes 1 and 2 and genotypes 3 and 4, respectively.

Whereas genotype 2 remains less commonly detected than other genotypes, genetic evolutionary analyses suggest that genotypes 1, 3, and 4 have spread substantially during the past 100 years.
