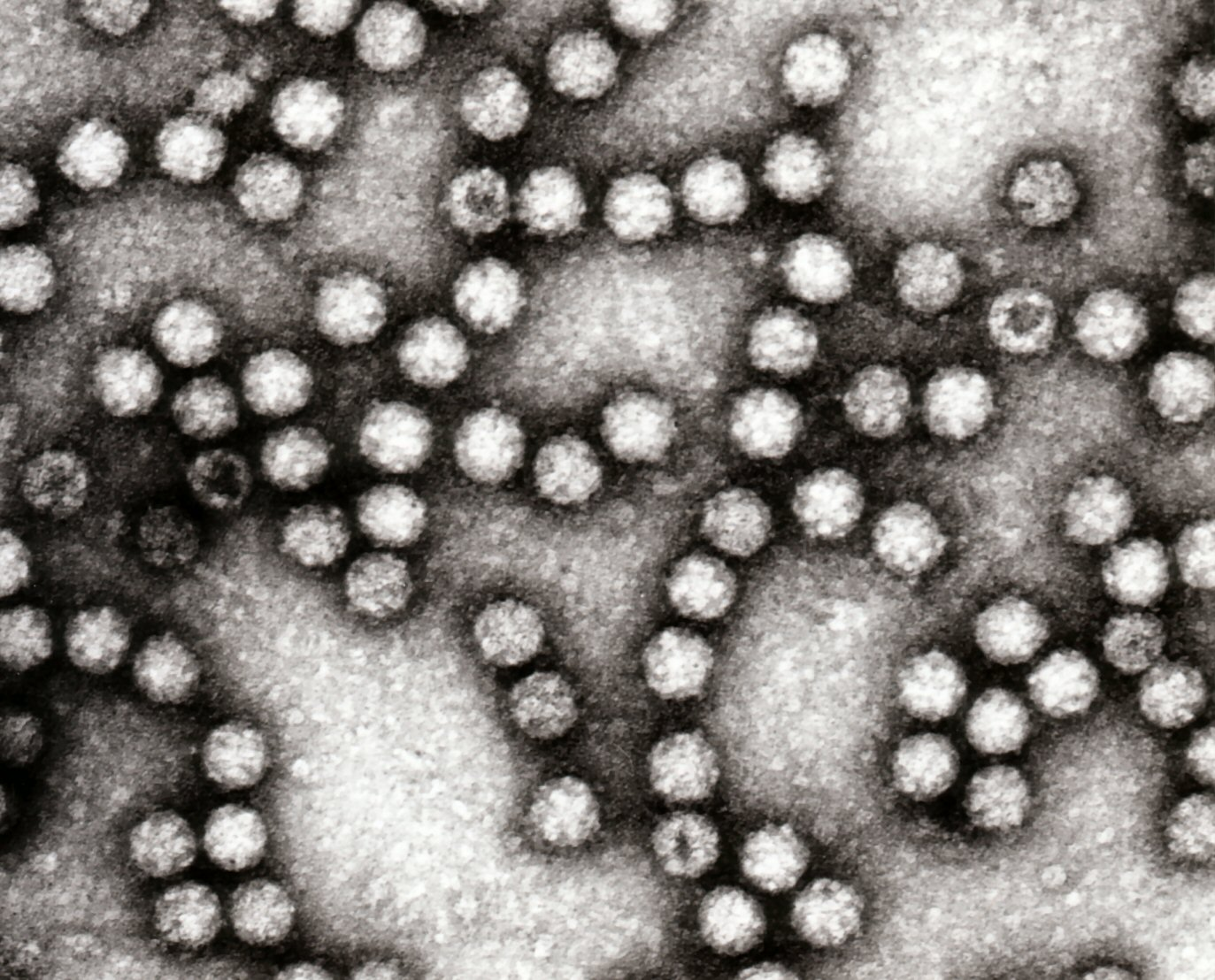
- Electron micrograph of Astroviruses
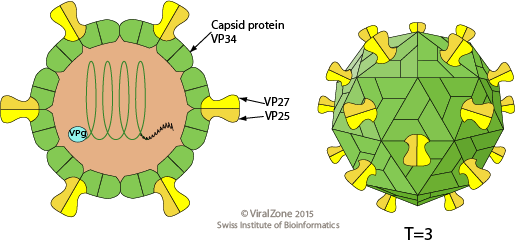
- Astrovirus virion

Virus classification
- (unranked): Virus
- Realm: Riboviria
- Kingdom: Orthornavirae
- Phylum: Pisuviricota
- Class: Stelpaviricetes
- Order: Stellavirales
- Family: Astroviridae

Genera
- Avastrovirus; Mamastrovirus

= Astrovirus =

Astroviridae

Family of viruses

Astroviruses (Astroviridae) are a type of virus that was first discovered in 1975 using electron microscopes following an outbreak of diarrhea in humans. In addition to humans, astroviruses have now been isolated from numerous mammalian animal species (and are classified as genus Mamastrovirus) and from avian species such as ducks, chickens, and turkey poults (classified as genus Avastrovirus). Human astroviruses have been shown in numerous studies to be an important cause of gastroenteritis in young children worldwide. In animals, Astroviruses also cause infection of the gastrointestinal tract but may also result in encephalitis (humans and cattle), hepatitis (avian) and nephritis (avian).

Astroviruses are 28–35 nm diameter, icosahedral viruses that have a characteristic five- or six-pointed star-like surface structure when viewed by electron microscopy. Along with the Picornaviridae and the Caliciviridae, the Astroviridae comprise a third family of nonenveloped viruses whose genome is composed of plus-sense, single-stranded RNA. Astrovirus has a non-segmented, single stranded, positive sense RNA genome within a non-enveloped icosahedral capsid.

== Microbiology ==
=== Taxonomy ===
This family of viruses consists of two genera, Avastrovirus (AAstV) and Mamastrovirus (MAstV).

The International Committee on Taxonomy of Viruses (ICTV) established Astroviridae as a viral family in 1995. There have been over 50 astroviruses reported, although the ICTV officially recognizes 22 species. The genus Avastrovirus comprises three species; Chicken astrovirus (Avian nephritis virus types 1–3), Duck astrovirus (Duck astrovirus C-NGB), and Turkey astrovirus (Turkey astrovirus 1). The genus Mamastrovirus includes Bovine astroviruses 1 and 2, Human astrovirus (types 1–8), Feline astrovirus 1, Porcine astrovirus 1, Mink astrovirus 1 and Ovine astrovirus 1.

=== Structure ===
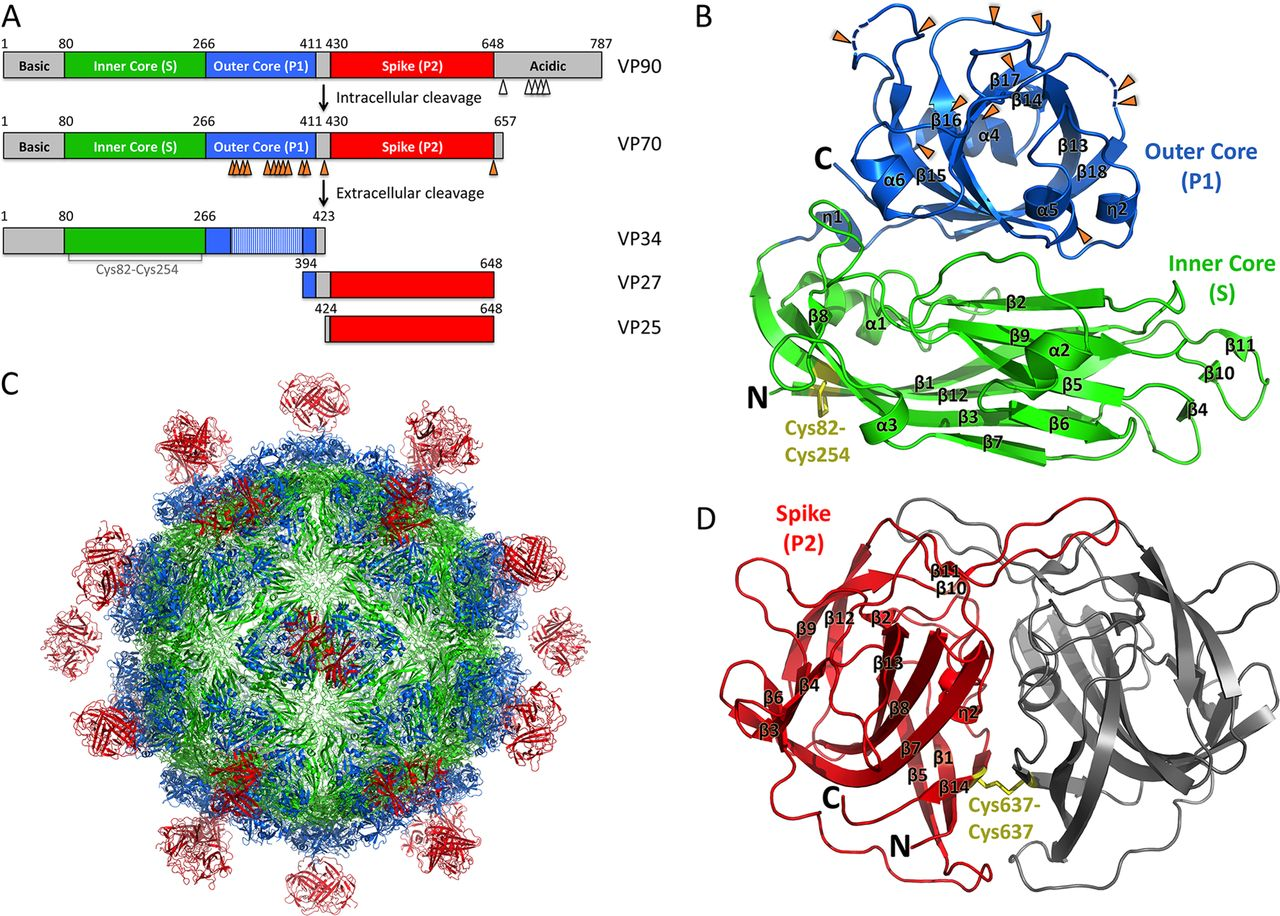
Schematics and crystal structures of HAstV-1 CP core and spike.

Astroviruses have a star-like appearance with five or six points. Their name is derived from the Greek word "astron" meaning star. They are non-enveloped RNA viruses with cubic capsids, approximately 28–35 nm in diameter with T=3 symmetry. Human astroviruses are part of the Mammastrovirus genus and contains 8 serotypes. The human astrovirus capsid spikes have a distinct structure. The spike domain in particular has a 3-layered beta-sandwiches fold and a core, 6-stranded beta-barrel structure. The beta-barrel has a hydrophobic core. The triple-layered beta-sandwich is packed outside the beta-barrel. The spike also forms a dimer. This unique structure was found to be similar to the protein projections found on the capsid of the hepatitis E virus. The projection domain of the human astrovirus contains a receptor binding site for polysaccharides. The amino acid sequence of the astrovirus capsid protein does not have similar homology to other known viral proteins, but the closest would be hepatitis E virus.

=== Life cycle ===
Astroviruses infect birds and mammals through the fecal-oral route. They have a tissue tropism for enterocytes. Entry into the host cell is achieved by attachment to host receptors, which mediates endocytosis. Replication follows the positive-strand RNA virus replication model. Astrovirus RNA is infectious and functions as a messenger RNA for ORF1a and ORF1b. A frame-shifting mechanism between these two nonstructural polypeptides translates RNA-dependent RNA polymerase. In replication complexes near intracellular membranes, ORF1a and ORF1b are cleaved to generate individual nonstructural proteins that are involved in replication. The resulting subgenomic RNA contains ORF2 and encodes precursor capsid protein (VP90). VP90 is proteolytically cleaved during packaging and produces immature capsids made of VP70. Following encapsidation, immature capsids are released from the cell without lysis. Extracellular virions are cleaved by Trypsin and form mature infectious virions.

=== Morphology ===
Astroviruses are 28-30 nm non-enveloped viruses with T-3 icosahedral symmetry. They have spherical shapes and consist of a capsid protein shell. Astroviruses have distinctive five or six pointed star-like projections on 10% of the virions (the other virions have smooth surfaces). The virion capsid is expressed from a subgenomic mRNA and its precursor undergoes multiple cleavages to make the VP70 protein. Capsids that are made of the VP70 protein are cleaved by trypsin to make particles that are very infectious (VP25/26, VP27/29 and VP34). The spikes that create the star-like appearance on the virion surface are made by two structural proteins (VP25 and VP27) while the capsid shell is made from VP34.

=== Genome ===
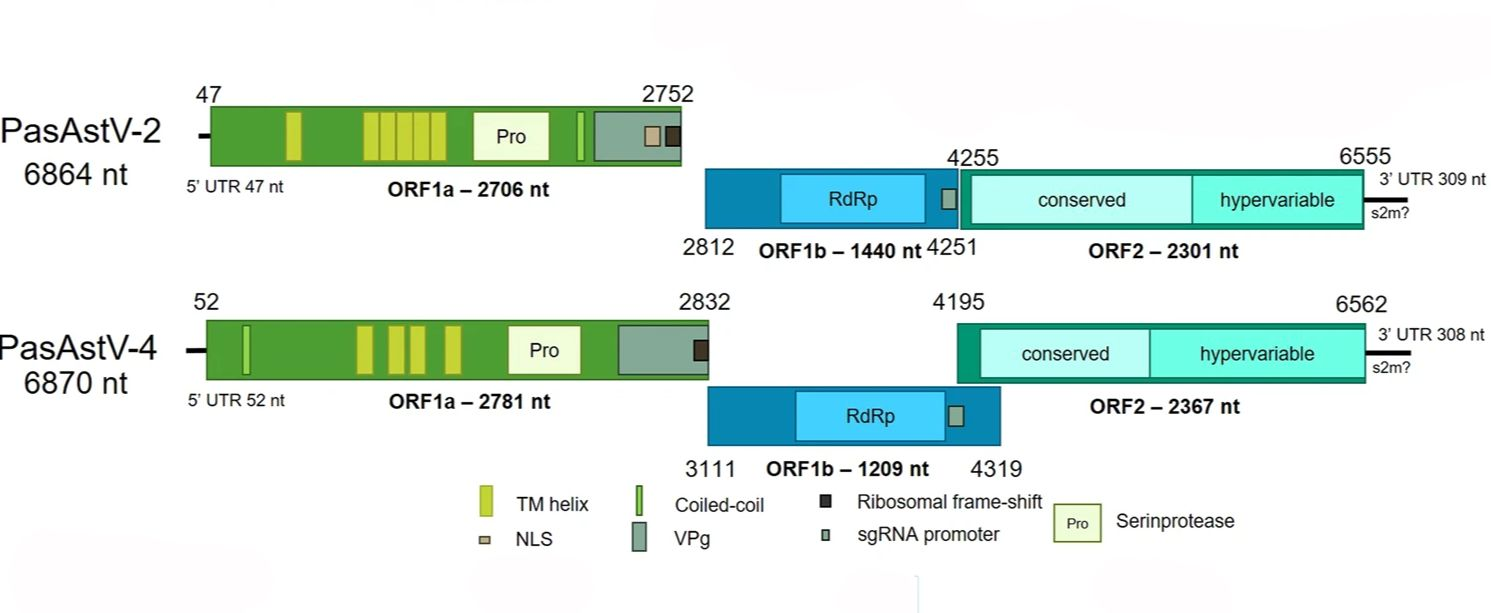
Schematic representation of the genomic organization of the two novel Passerine Astroviruses.

Astroviruses have a genome composed of a single strand of positive sense RNA. The strand has a poly A tail at the 3' end, but no 5' cap but instead is linked to a VPg protein. With the exclusion of polyadenylation at the 3' end, the genome is between 6.8 and 7.9 kb long. The genome is arranged into three open reading frames (ORFs), with an overlap of approximately 70 nucleotides between ORF1a and ORF1b. The remaining ORF is known as ORF2. ORF2 encode the structural proteins, which are -at least- VP26, VP29 and VP32, the most antigenic and immunogenic of these being VP26. This protein is probably involved in the first steps of viral infection, being a key factor in the biological cycle of astroviruses. The human astrovirus genome mutation rate has been estimated to be 3.7×10^{−3} nucleotide substitutions per site per year with the synonymous changes rate of 2.8×10^{−3} nucleotide substitutions per site per year. The capability for genetic recombination appears to be present in type-3 and type-4 human astroviruses, and in porcine astrovirus strains.

=== Replication ===
Replication of astroviruses occur in the cytoplasm. Astrovirus RNA is infectious and functions as a messenger RNA for ORF1a and ORF1b, with translation initiation thought to be mediated by VPg similar to Caliciviridae. A frame-shifting mechanism between these two nonstructural polypeptides translates RNA-dependent RNA polymerase (RdRp). In replication complexes near intracellular membranes, ORF1a and ORF1b are cleaved to generate individual nonstructural proteins that are involved in replication. RdRp transcribes subgenomic RNA from the subgenomic promoter, which enables higher production of structural proteins. Subgenomic RNA contains ORF2 which encodes precursor capsid protein (VP90). VP90 is proteolytically cleaved during packaging and produces immature capsids made of VP70. Following encapsidation, immature capsids are released from the cell without lysis. Extracellular virions are cleaved by Trypsin and form mature infectious virions.

=== Evolution ===
The Astroviridae capsid is related to those of the Tymoviridae. The non-structural region is related to the Potyviridae. It appears that this group of viruses may have arise at some point in the past as a result of recombination event between two distinct viruses and that this even occurred at the junction of the structural and non-structural coding regions.

== Species infected ==
=== Avastrovirus ===
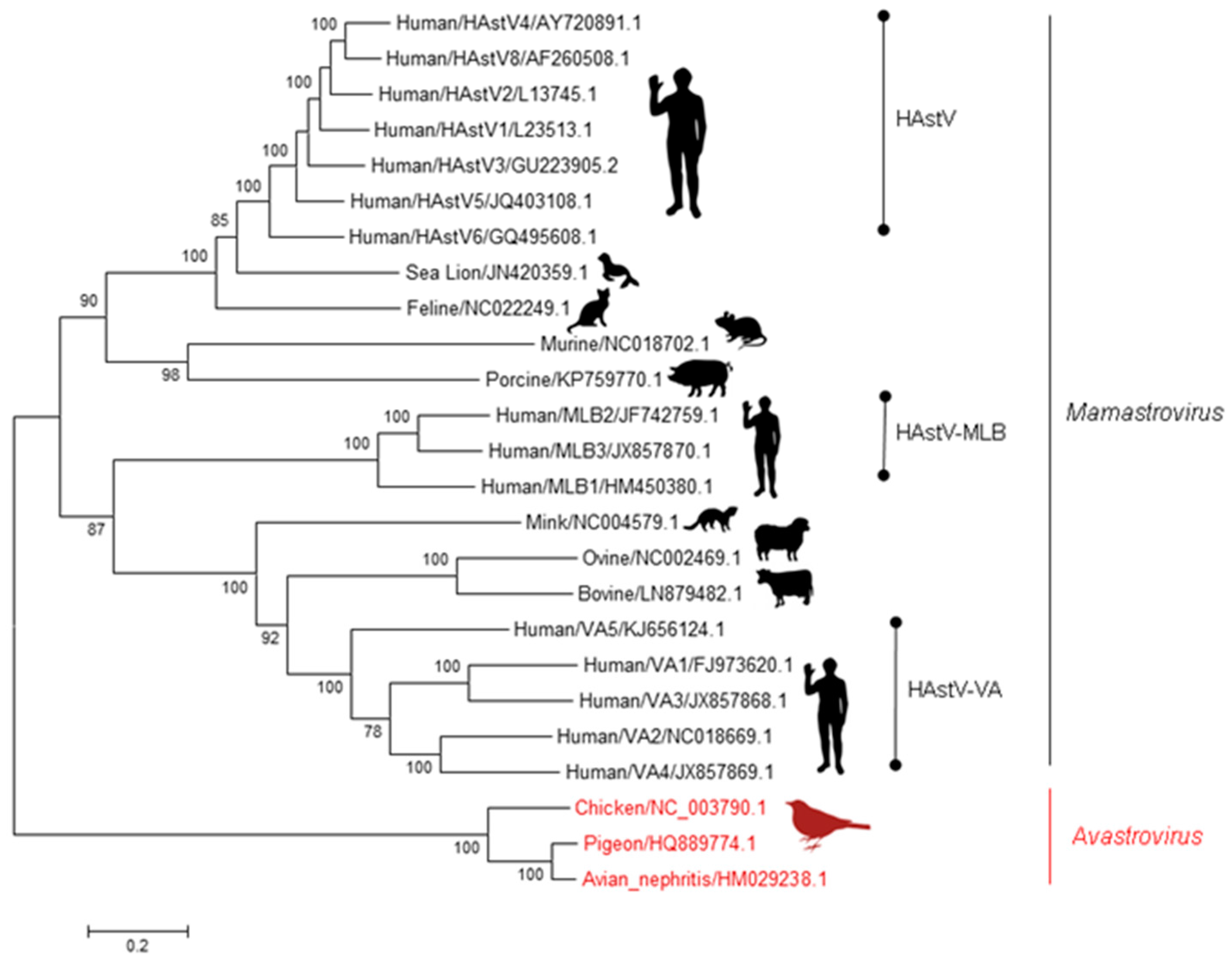
Phylogenetic tree of astroviruses and the species infected by them

Avastrovirus 1–3 are associated with enteric infections in turkeys, ducks, chicken and guinea fowl. In turkey poults 1–3 weeks of age, some symptoms of enteritis include diarrhea, listlessness, liver eating and nervousness. These symptoms are usually mild but in cases of poult enteritis and mortality syndrome (PEMS), which has dehydration, immune dysfunction and anorexia as symptoms, mortality is high. Post mortem examination of the intestines of infected birds show fluid filled intestines. Hyperplasia of enterocytes is also observed in histopathology studies. However, in contrast to other enteric viruses, there isn't villous supply.

Avastrovirus species often infect extraintestinal sites such as the kidney or liver resulting in hepatitis and nephritis. Birds infected by avian nephritis virus typically die within 3 weeks of infection. The viral particles can be detected in fecal matter within 2 days and peak virus shedding occurs 4–5 days after infection. The virus can be found in the kidney, jejunum, spleen, liver and bursa of infected birds. Symptoms of this disease include diarrhea and weight loss. Necropsies show swollen and discolored kidneys and there is evidence of death of the epithelial cells and lymphocytic interstitial nephritis. Another extraintestinal avastrovirus is avian hepatitis virus which infects ducks. Hepatitis in ducks caused by this duck astrovirus (DAstV) is often fatal.

In birds, Avastroviruses are detected by antigen-capture ELISA. In the absence of vaccines, sanitation is the prevalent way to prevent Avastrovirus infections.

=== Mamastrovirus ===
Mamastroviruses often cause gastroenteritis in infected mammals. In animals, gastroenteritis is usually undiagnosed because most astrovirus infections are asymptomatic. However, in mink and humans, astroviruses can cause diarrhea and can be fatal. The incubation period for Mamastrovirus is 1–4 days. When symptoms occur, the incubation period is followed by diarrhea for several days. In mink, symptoms include increased secretion from apocrine glands. Human astroviruses are associated with gastroenteritis in children and immunocompromised adults. 2–8% of acute non-bacterial gastroenteritis in children is associated with human astrovirus. These viral particles are usually detected in epithelial cells of the duodenum. In sheep, ovine astroviruses were found in the villi of the small intestine.

Mamastroviruses also cause diseases of the nervous system. These diseases most commonly occur in cattle, mink and humans. In cattle, this occurs sporadically and infects individual animals. Symptoms of this infection include seizure, lateral recumbency and impaired coordination. Histological examinations showed neuronal necrosis and gliosis of the cerebral cortex, cerebellum, spinal cord and brainstem.

== Signs and symptoms in humans ==
Members of a relatively new virus family, the astroviridae, astroviruses are now recognised as a cause of gastroenteritis in children, whose immune systems are underdeveloped, and elderly adults, whose immune systems are generally somewhat compromised. Presence of viral particles in fecal matter and in epithelial intestinal cells indicate that the virus replicates in the gastrointestinal tract of humans. The main symptoms are diarrhoea, followed by nausea, vomiting, fever, malaise and abdominal pain. Some research studies have shown that the incubation period of the disease is approximately three to four days. Astrovirus infection is not usually a severe situation and only in some rare cases leads to dehydration. The severity and variation in symptoms correlates with the region the case develops in. This could be due to climatic factors influencing the life cycle or transmission method for that particular strain of Astrovirus. Malnutrition and immunodeficiency tend to exacerbate the condition, leading to more severe cases or secondary conditions that could require hospital care. Otherwise, infected people do not need hospitalization because symptoms will reduce by themselves, after 2 to 4 days.

Human infections are usually self-limiting but may also spread systematically and infect immunocompromised individuals.

Astroviruses most frequently cause infection of the gastrointestinal tract but in some animals they may result in encephalitis (humans and cattle), hepatitis (avian) and nephritis (avian).

=== Diagnosis ===
Electron microscopy, enzyme-immunoassay (ELISA), immunofluorescence, and polymerase chain reaction have all been used for detecting virus particle, antigens or viral nucleic acid in the stools of infected people. A method using real-time RT-PCR, which can detect all human astrovirus genotypes, has been reported. Some RT-qPCR techniques are able to simultaneously detect human astroviruses and other enteric viruses associated with gastroenteritis. Microarrays are also used to differentiate between the eight different human astrovirus serotypes.

== Pathogenesis ==
Astroviruses cause gastroenteritis by causing destruction of the intestinal epithelium, leading to the inhibition of usual absorption mechanism, loss of secretory functions, and decrease in epithelial permeability in the intestines. Inflammatory responses were seen to not affect astrovirus pathogenesis.

== Epidemiology ==
Astroviruses are associated with 5–9% of the cases of gastroenteritis in young children. Humans of all ages are susceptible to astrovirus infection, but children, the elderly, and those that are immunocompromised are most prone. A study of intestinal disease in the UK, published in 1999, determined incidence as 3.8/1000 patient years in the community (95% CI, range 2.3–6.4), the fourth most common known cause of viral gastroenteritis. Studies in the USA have detected astroviruses in the stools of 2–9% of children presenting symptoms; illness is most frequent in children younger than two years, although outbreaks among adults and the elderly have been reported. Early studies carried out in Glasgow demonstrated that a significant proportion of babies excreting virus particles did not exhibit gastrointestinal symptoms. Seroprevalence studies carried out in the US have shown that 90% of children have antibody to HastV-1 by age 9, suggesting that (largely asymptomatic) infection is common. Looking at the pattern of disease, it suggests that antibodies provide protection through adult life until the antibody titre begins to decline later in life.

The occurrence of astrovirus infections vary depending on the season. In temperate climates, infection is highest during winter months possibly due to lower temperatures which enhance the stability of the virus. This is in contrast to tropical regions where prevalence is highest during the rainy season. The seasonal distribution in tropical climates can be explained by the effect of rain particularly on the breakdown of sanitation in developing countries.

Human astroviruses are transmitted by the fecal–oral route. The main mode of astrovirus transmission is by contaminated food and water. Young children in childcare backgrounds or adults in military barracks are most likely to develop the disease. Human astroviruses may be released in large quantities in the stool of infected individuals and contaminate groundwater, fresh water and marine water due to inadequate wastewater treatment. Fruits and vegetables grown in such contaminated water may also act as sources of viral infection. Poor food handling practices, poor hand hygiene and contamination of inanimate objects are other factors that encourage enteric virus transmission.

Astroviruses can also be transmitted to humans from other animal species. In comparison to individuals who had no contact with turkey, turkey abattoir workers were three times more likely to test positive for antibodies against turkey astroviruses. Furthermore, some human, duck, chicken and turkey astroviruses are phylogenetically related and share genetic features.

== Prevention ==
Human astroviruses can be prevented by detection and inactivation in contaminated food and water in addition to disinfection of contaminated fomites.

== Treatment ==
=== Astrovirus Immunoglobulin ===
In a study by Bjorkholm et al., a 78-year-old patient diagnosed with Waldenstrom's macroglobulinemia was given 0.4 g/kg of astrovirus immunoglobulin for four days, and the symptoms dissolved leading to a full recovery from astrovirus; however, further testing has yet to be completed.

=== Achyrocline bogotensis antiviral therapy ===
In a study by Tellez et al., extracts from a plant Achyrocline bogotensis was used to develop an antiviral therapy for both rotavirus and astrovirus. Achyrocline bogotensis was commonly used for skin and urinary infections. Drug testing methodology involved application of the extract to cell for pre-treatment (blocking), direct viral activity (evidence of killing the virus), and treatment (a decrease in the viral load after an infection is established). The extract demonstrated direct viral activity by killing astroviruses directly and treatment by leading to a decrease in the viral load after an established infection. A pre-treatment effect was not evident during the experiment.

== Timeline ==
1975: Appleton and Higgins first discovered astrovirus in stool samples of children suffering from gastroenteritis by using electron microscopy (EM)

1975: Madeley and Cosgrove named the 20–30 nm viral particle Astrovirus based on the star-like EM (electron microscopy) appearance

1976-1992: Lee and Kurtz serotyped 291 astrovirus stool samples in Oxford; discovered serotypes 6 and 7

1981: Lee and Kurtz were able to grow astrovirus in tripsin-dependent tissue culture by using human embryo kidney cells (HEK)

1985: Lee and Kurtz discover two serotypes of astrovirus that are used to type 13 strains of community-acquired astrovirus

1987: Gray et al. discovered that a 22-day long gastroenteritis outbreak in an elderly home was caused by astrovirus type 1 and calicivirus

1988: Hermann and Hudson use antigen characterization of HEK grown astroviruses to develop monoclonal antibodies

1992: Cruz et al. analyzed 5,000 stool samples 7.5% of the diarrheal diseases found in Guatemalan ambulatory rural children were caused by astroviruses

1993: Jiang et al. sequence astrovirus RNA and determine the presence of three ORFs and ribosomal frameshifting

1993: Monroe et al. classify subgenomic data for astrovirus, providing support for astrovirus to be classified as a viral family

1994: Oishi et al. determine astrovirus as the main cause of gastroenteritis in schools in Katano City, Osaka, Japan

1995: Bjorkholm elt al. conducted a clinical study, and 78-year-old male Waldenström's macroglobulinemia patient with astrovirus-associated gastroenteritis was successfully treated with intravenous immunoglobulin

1995: Jonassen et al. uses PCR to detect all known serotypes (7) of astrovirus

1995: In their sixth report, ICTV establishes Astroviridae as a viral family

1996: Glass et al. states an epidemiological shift regarding astrovirus due to improvements in RT-PCT (reverse transcription PCR), monoclonal antibodies, and enzyme immunoassays (EIA); astroviruses are now considered one of the main causes of diarrheal disease worldwide

1996: Palombo and Bishop the epidemiology of astrovirus infections in children suffering from gastroenteritis in Melbourne, Australia (data collected include total incidence, genetic diversity, serotype characterization)

1998: Unicomb et al. conduct a clinical study in Bangladesh and conclude astrovirus infections involving nosocomial, acute, and persistent diarrheal diseases

1998: Gaggero et al. identify human astrovirus type 1 to be the main cause of acute gastroenteritis in Chilean children

1999: Bon et al. discover astrovirus in a gastroenteritis outbreak in Dijon, France

2001: Dennehy et al. collected stool samples from hospitalized children suffering from acute gastroenteritis; astrovirus was determined the second leading cause of gastroenteritis after rotavirus

2002: Guix et al. completes an epidemiological study on the presence of astrovirus in Barcelona, Spain; the total incidence of astrovirus in 2,347 samples was 4.95 with a peak in the number of cases in the winter

2003: Basu et al. discovered astrovirus in 2.7% of stool samples collected from 346 children suffering from gastroenteritis in Gaborone, Botswana

2009: Finkbeiner et al. used Sanger sequencing to discover a novel astrovirus in stool samples from children suffering from an acute gastroenteritis outbreak at a childcare center

2009: Using RT-PCR, Kapoor et al. discover novel astrovirus strains HMOAstV species A, B, C which are very similar to astroviruses found in mink and ovine species; this showed that the virus may have the ability to jump species
