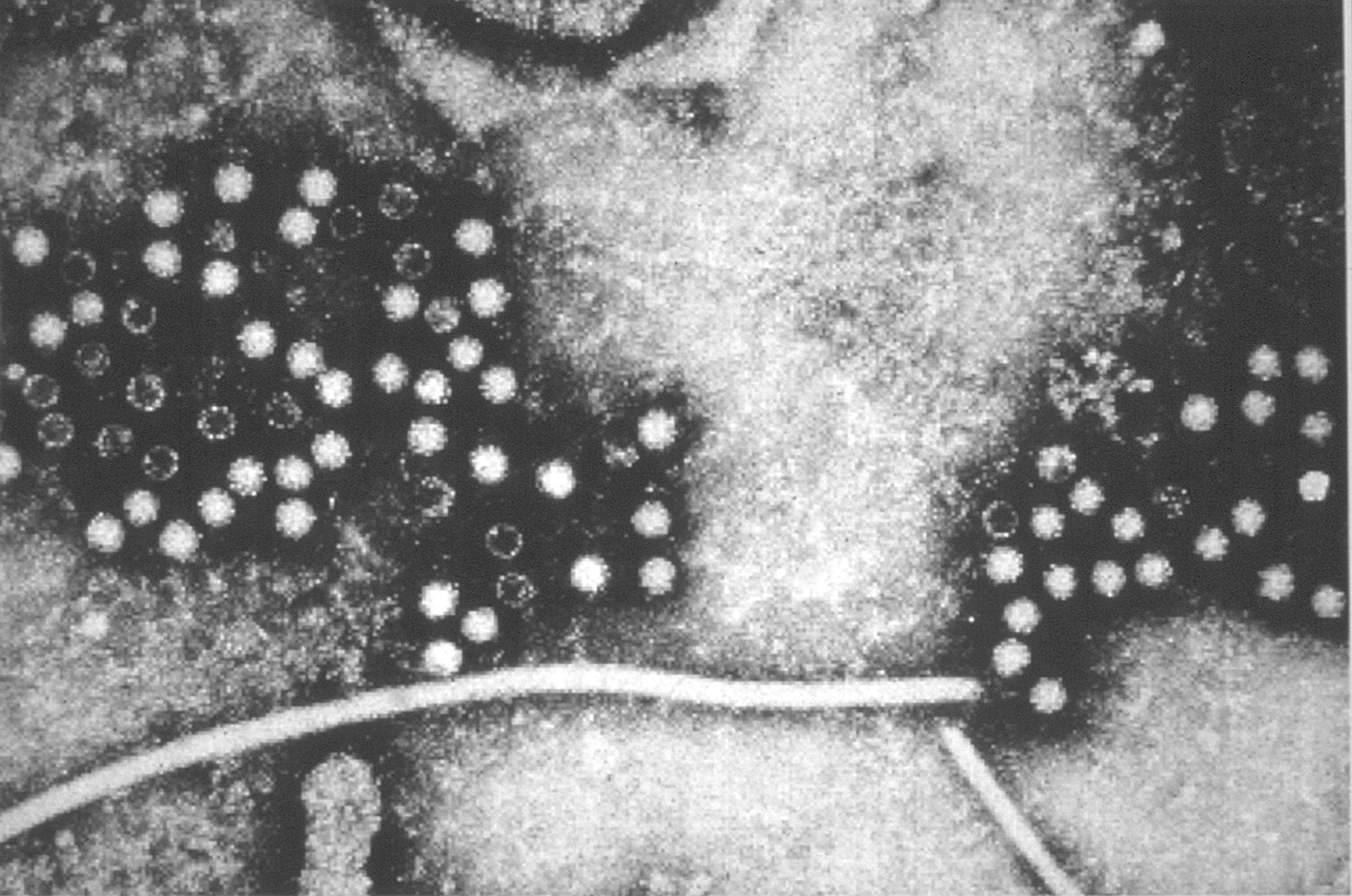
- TEM micrograph of hepatitis E virions

Virus classification
- (unranked): Virus
- Realm: Riboviria
- Kingdom: Orthornavirae
- Phylum: Kitrinoviricota
- Class: Alsuviricetes
- Order: Hepelivirales
- Family: Hepeviridae

Subtaxa
- See text

= Hepeviridae =

Family of viruses

Hepeviridae is a family of viruses. Human, pig, wild boar, sheep, cow, camel, monkey, some rodents, bats and chickens serve as natural hosts. There are two subfamilies with five genera in the family. Diseases associated with this family include: hepatitis; high mortality rate during pregnancy; and avian hepatitis E virus is the cause of hepatitis-splenomegaly (HS) syndrome among chickens.

== Taxonomy ==
The following subfamilies and genera are assigned to the family (-virinae denotes subfamily and -viridae denotes family):

- Orthohepevirinae
  - Avihepevirus
  - Chirohepevirus
  - Paslahepevirus
  - Rocahepevirus
- Parahepevirinae
  - Piscihepevirus

== Structure ==
Viruses in the family Hepeviridae are non-enveloped, with icosahedral and spherical geometries, and T=1 symmetry. The diameter is around 32–34 nm. Genomes are linear and non-segmented, around 7.2 kb in length. The genome has three open reading frames.

== Evolution ==
This has been studied by examining the ORF1 and the capsid proteins. The ORF1 protein appears to be related to members of the Alphatetraviridae – a member of the "Alpha-like" super-group of viruses – while the capsid protein is related to that of the chicken astrovirus capsid – a member of the "Picorna-like" supergroup. This suggests that a recombination event at some point in the past between at least two distinct viruses gave rise to the ancestor of this family. This recombination event occurred at the junction of the encoding regions of the structural and non-structural proteins.

== Life cycle ==
Entry into the host cell is achieved by attachment of the virus to host receptors, which mediates clathrin-mediated endocytosis. Replication follows the positive stranded RNA virus replication model. Positive-stranded RNA virus transcription is the method of transcription. Translation takes place by leaky scanning. Human, pig, wild boar, monkey, cow, sheep, camel some rodents, bat and chicken serve as the natural host. Transmission routes are zoonosis and fomite.
