= Hepelivirales =

Virus classification
- (unranked): Virus
- Realm: Riboviria
- Kingdom: Orthornavirae
- Phylum: Kitrinoviricota
- Class: Alsuviricetes
- Order: Hepelivirales

Order of viruses

Hepelivirales is an order of viruses.

== Taxonomy ==
The order contains the following families:

- Alphatetraviridae
- Benyviridae
- Hepeviridae
- Matonaviridae
- Mycoalphaviridae
