= Mottle virus =

Mottle virus may refer to:

- Andean potato mottle virus
- Bean pod mottle virus
- Bidens mottle virus
- Blueberry leaf mottle virus
- Carnation mottle virus
- Carnation vein mottle virus
- Carrot mottle virus
- Cassava green mottle virus
- Cherry mottle leaf virus
- Chilli veinal mottle virus
- Cocksfoot mottle virus
- Cowpea mild mottle virus
- Cowpea chlorotic mottle virus
- Cucumber green mottle mosaic virus
- Elm mottle virus
- Lettuce speckles mottle virus
- Lily mottle virus
- Oat necrotic mottle virus
- Peanut mottle virus
- Pepper mottle virus
- Pepper mild mottle virus
- Primula mottle virus
- Rice yellow mottle virus
- Soybean chlorotic mottle virus
- Sweet potato mild mottle virus
- Tomato mottle mosaic virus
- Tulip breaking virus
