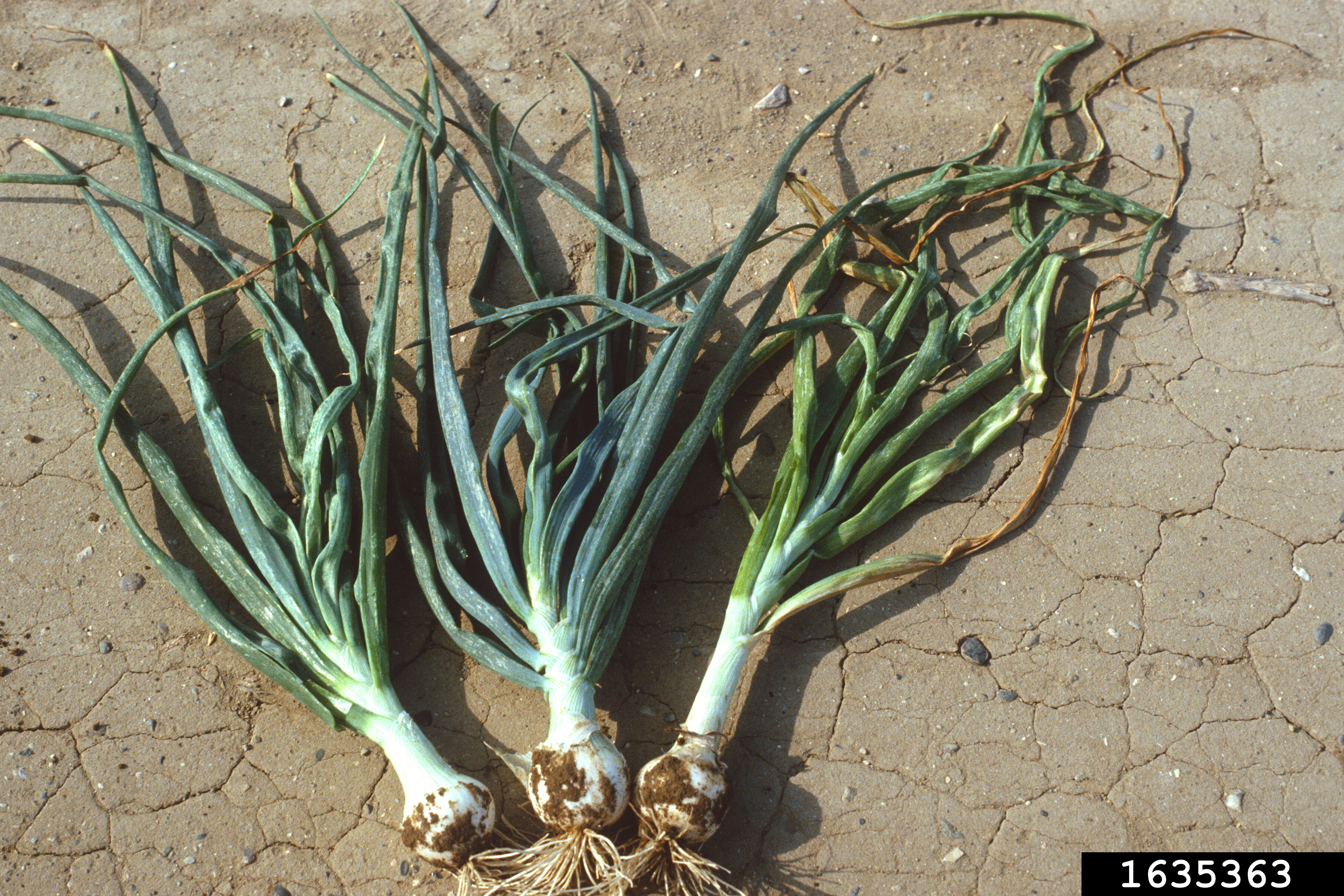
- Symptoms of Onion yellow dwarf virus in onions (Allium cepa L.)

Virus classification
- (unranked): Virus
- Realm: Riboviria
- Kingdom: Orthornavirae
- Phylum: Pisuviricota
- Class: Stelpaviricetes
- Order: Patatavirales
- Family: Potyviridae
- Genus: Potyvirus
- Species: Potyvirus cepae

= Onion yellow dwarf virus =

Species of virus

Onion yellow dwarf virus (OYDV) is a plant virus in the genus Potyvirus that has been identified worldwide and mainly infects species of Allium such as onion, garlic, and leek. The virus causes mild to severe leaf malformation, and bulb reduction up to sixty percent has been observed in garlic.

== Genome ==
The full genome of OYDV is around 10,538 nucleotides long and encodes a polyprotein of 3,403 amino acids. Its P3 gene is longer than those of other known Potyviruses.

OYDV is the first potyvirus found which has natural deletion mutants lacking the N-terminal region of helper-component proteinase (HC-Pro). The mutant isolates are common. Garlic plants grown commercially are generally co-infected with both the normal and attenuated isolates. RNA silencing suppressor activities in isolates, which lack the long stretch of the N-terminal amino acids (~ 100 residues) in their HC-Pro gene, are observed to be low.

== Transmission ==
Isolates with complete HC-Pro sequences were non-persistently transmitted by aphids on their own, while the isolates with short HC-Pros (OYDV-S) were only aphid transmissible when they were co-infected with leek yellow stripe virus (LYSV), another potyvirus that mostly infects Allium spp. LYSV HC-Pro was assumed to interlink both LYSV and OYDV-S with the aphid stylet. OYDV is not transmitted by dodder.
