= Sweet potato latent virus =

Virus classification
- (unranked): Virus
- Realm: Riboviria
- Kingdom: Orthornavirae
- Phylum: Pisuviricota
- Class: Stelpaviricetes
- Order: Patatavirales
- Family: Potyviridae
- Genus: Potyvirus
- Species: Potyvirus batatalatentis

Synonyms
- Sweet potato virus N SPLV

Species of virus

Sweet potato latent virus (SPLV), formerly designated as sweet potato virus N, was first reported from Taiwan. The virus has flexuous, filamentous particles of approximately 700-750 nm long and induces typical cylindrical inclusion proteins in the cytoplasm of infected cells. The experimental host range of SPLV is wider than that of Sweet potato feathery mottle virus (SPFMV), and it induces symptoms on some Chenopodium and Nicotiana species. SPLV is serologically related to, but distinct from SPFMV. Sequence comparison of the 3’-partial sequences showed that SPLV was a distinct species of the genus Potyvirus in the family Potyviridae. The virus is common in China and has also been found in Korea and Rwanda.
