= Carrot virus Y =

Virus classification
- (unranked): Virus
- Realm: Riboviria
- Kingdom: Orthornavirae
- Phylum: Pisuviricota
- Class: Stelpaviricetes
- Order: Patatavirales
- Family: Potyviridae
- Genus: Potyvirus
- Species: Potyvirus carotae

Species of virus

Carrot virus Y (CarVY) is a plant virus that affects crops of the carrot family (Apiaceae), such as carrots, anise, chervil, coriander, cumin, dill and parsnip. Carrots are the only known crop to be infected in the field. Infection by the virus leads to deformed roots and discolored or mottled leaves. The virus is spread through insect vectors, and is currently only found in Australia.

== Symptoms ==
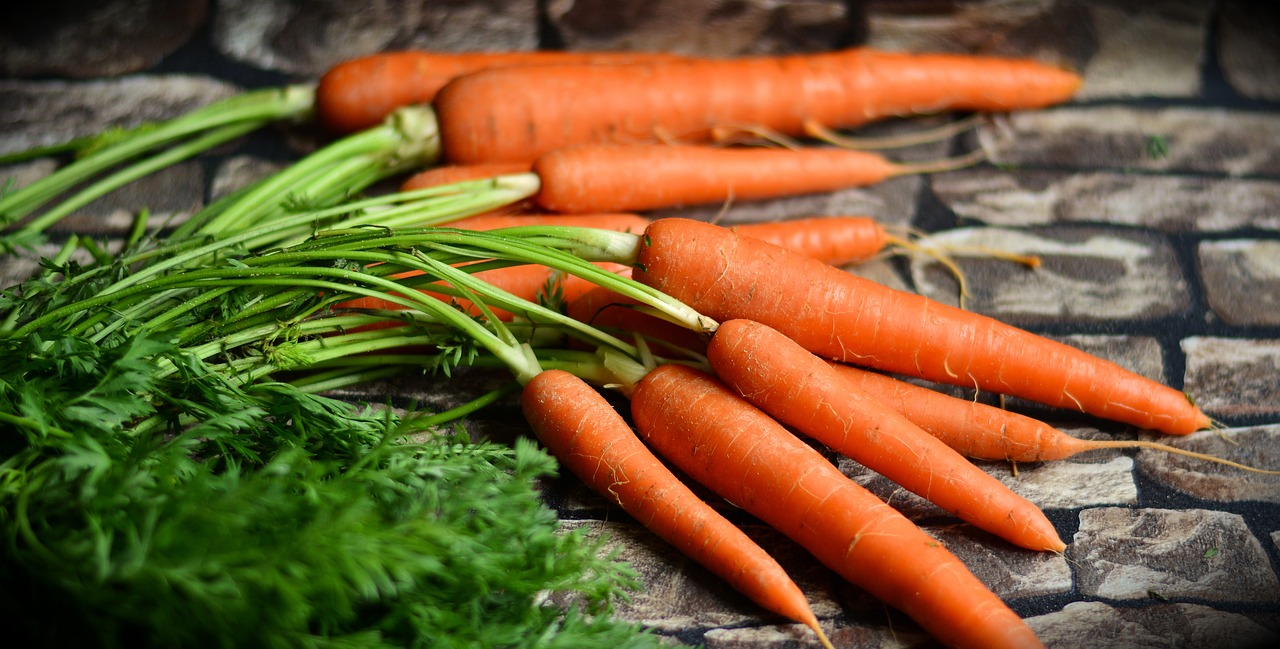
The carrot, a root vegetable, is the main host of Carrot virus Y

=== Foliage ===
The symptoms of CarVY in carrot foliage may include chlorotic mottle (irregular small yellow patches), marginal leaflet necrosis or reddening, generalised chlorosis of leaves, and plant stunting. Necrosis occurs when a living organism's cells or tissues die or degenerate. Plant necrosis causes leaves, stems and other parts of the plant to darken and wilt. This is a result of the virus using the plant as a host, as the plant's energy is diverted to the virus rather than to the plant's growth. Over time, this energy depletion leads to necrosis in the infected area where the virus is replicating itself. In plant chlorosis, tissues that are normally green become pale, yellow, or bleached. This results from chlorophyll failing to develop due to the infection of the virus. Additionally, the infected plant can portray a ‘feathery’ appearance due to an increase in the subdivisions of the carrot leaflets.

Leaf symptoms and plant stunting symptoms differ greatly between different carrot varieties. Some plants will develop obvious symptoms that can be easily seen from a distance. However, others can express symptoms that are so mild that they are difficult to see even upon close inspection of affected plants. In actively growing carrot crops, foliage symptoms of CarVY are easily confused with the symptoms of nutritional deficiencies. Additionally, growers routinely stop adding fertilizers at the end of each growing season to reduce post-harvest carrot disorders. This results in leaf yellowing symptoms, which can be confused with the symptoms that resemble those caused by CarVY.

=== Roots ===
The roots of carrot plants also become severely deformed as a result of CarVY infection. When carrot plants become infected with CarVY at an early stage in the growth cycle, they portray stubby roots with severe distortion and knobbliness (the ‘Michelin carrot’ syndrome). Carrots that are infected later in the life cycle are thinner and longer than carrots infected earlier. Furthermore, in plants infected early, the tops of the roots tend to emerge from the soil and become exposed to the sun. This results in the ‘shoulders’ of the carrots turning a green color. Early infected plants also have severe distortion of the internal vascular cambium. Instead of its normal circular shape, carrots exhibit a star-like vascular cambium consisting of multiple contortions.

Entire fields have been abandoned due to crop infection. The severe root defomalities associated with early virus infection make the carrots unmarketable. Carrots infected later in the growth cycle do not display such dramatic deformations, but are still considered less-desirable and are sold and a significantly lower price.

== Structure ==
CarVY belongs to the Potyviridae family of viruses. Potyviruses are non-enveloped viruses that are symmetrically helical. These filamentous viruses are typically 720-850 nm long and 12-15 nm in diameter. Their flexuous virions can be easily identified in infected carrot leaf samples using electron microscopy.

=== Genome ===
The non-segmented, linear genome of CarVY is 1,754 kb. CarVY is typically 11 nm wide and 770 nm long.

== Vectors ==
=== Aphids ===
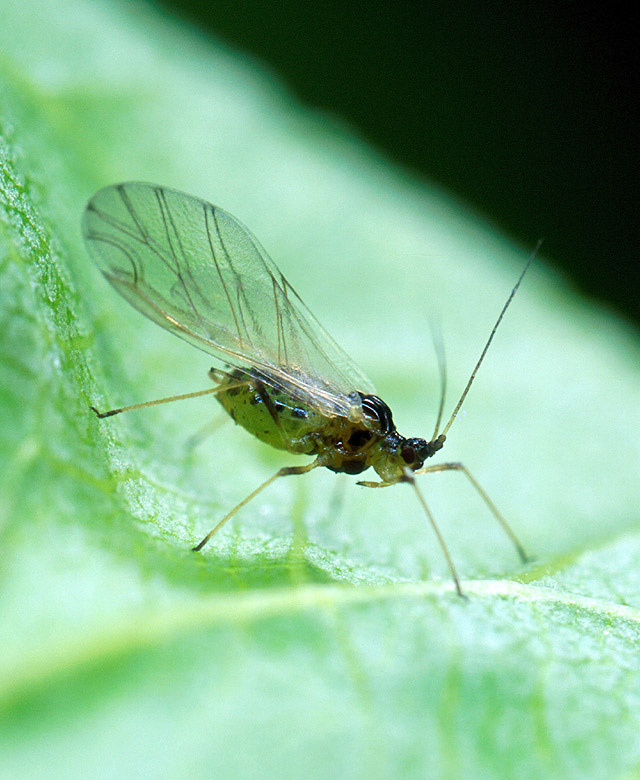
Myzus persicae, the green peach aphid, is an effective transmitter of Carrot virus Y

CarVY is transmitted between plants by aphids, including those that do not normally colonize carrots. Aphids are soft-bodied insects that feed on plant sap. Their sucking mouthparts allow for viruses to be transmitted between plants. With their ability to reproduce asexually, they are able to multiply and colonize very quickly. This allows them to spread a virus very quickly. Myzus persicae (M. personae), a small green aphid most commonly known as the green peach aphid, is the most efficient transmitter of the virus. By feeding on the sap of the carrot plant, aphids ingest the virus of the host, which they can later transmit to other uninfected plants that they will feed on. Other colonizing species, such as Aphis spiraecola (green citrus aphid) and D. apiifolia (hawthorn parsley aphid), can also be successful virus vectors. Non-colonizing species such as Lipahis erysimi (turnip aphid) and Acyrthosiphon kondoi (bluegreen aphid), may also serve as efficient transmitters.

=== Seeds ===
It is unknown if infected seeds can transmit the virus to other seeds. If CarVY is confirmed to be transmissible in future research, it is expected that it will only be at low levels, as Lettuce mosaic virus (LMV), a potyvirus, is only transmissible at very low levels. LMV is a potyvirus that affects vegetable crops. If seed transmission is confirmed, seed stock will need to be routinely tested before sowing.

== Transmission ==
If an aphid is able to successfully take up a virion, and the virion remains stable, the virus can be transmitted to a new host. In relation to the aphid, potyviruses are noncirculative viruses. Noncirculative viruses are associated with the mouthparts and foregut, giving them a more superficial and transient relationship with the vector. CarVY does not appear to harm its aphid vector. Virus transmission consists of at least three steps:

=== Acquisition ===
The first step in viral transmission is acquisition, which consists of the uptake of the virus from an infected source. Aphids are well designed for their roles as vectors. Their mouthparts consist of a needle-like stylet that is capable of piercing plant cells walls in order to feed on the plant's sugary sap. Aphids can facilitate the uptake and delivery of virions into plant cells without causing too much irreversible damage to the host.

=== Stabilization ===
The purpose of the second step of transmission is the stable retention of acquired virions in the vector at specific sites. A virus destined for inoculation is retained at sites within the stylet and food canal, or in the foregut. Potyvirus virions cannot be transmitted alone. Rather, they associate with a second viral-encoded accessory protein, termed “helper component” (HC). The virion and the HC associate with the cuticular lining of the aphid food canal. The “bridge hypothesis” helps explain how the HC functions as a bridge that attaches virions to the food canal of the aphid vector. The HC is a multifunctional protein, and mutations in the domains that make up the HC protein can affect transmission.

=== Inoculation ===
The final step in transmission is inoculation. Inoculation consists of the release of bound or retained virions and their delivery to a site of infection. The needle-like stylet delivers virions to the new host plant. Salivation may be important in enhancing the release of bound virions and their delivery into plant cells.

== Replication cycle ==
The replication cycle of CarVY have not been explicitly studied, but it can be assumed that the virus follows the (+)ss-RNA infectious cycle of the potyvirus.

As other (+)RNA plant viruses do, potyviruses utilize the protein synthesis machinery of the host in the production of viral proteins. They also make use of the endomembrane and cellular secretion systems in the formation of viral replication complexes (VRCs), and use the cell connecting plasmodesmata (PD) to spread their viral genome to other cells in the host.

A potyvirus penetrates into a cell of the host, thereby infecting it. The virus is uncoated, a process in which the helical viral proteins are removed. This exposes the viral genomic RNA to the cytoplasm. The RNA is then translated to produce a polyprotein, which is then processed by viral proteases into RNA dependent RNA polymerase and structural proteins. These are both used to replicate the viral genome, which takes place in cytoplasmic viral factories. Using the (+)ssRNA genome originally used to infect the host, a dsRNA genome is synthesized. This new genome is then transcribed and replicated, producing viral mRNAs and new (+)ssRNA genomes. Virions are then assembled in the cytoplasm, and the virus is ready to be transferred to new cells. It is assumed that the viral movement protein P3N-PIPO mediates cell-to-cell transfer of the virions. This allows the virus to further infect the host.

== Incidence ==
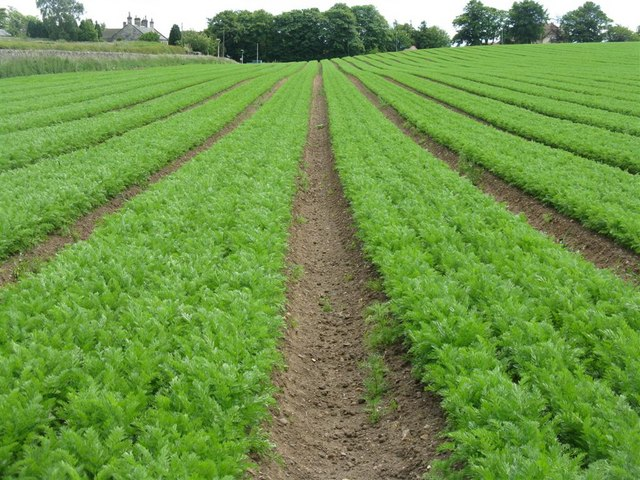
A field of carrot crops.

CarVY has currently only been detected in Australia. It has been found in carrot crops in the states of New South Wales, Queensland, South Australia, Tasmania, Victoria and Western Australia. The incidence of CarVY is high on farms that have continuous carrot production. The incidence is found to be lower when farms rotate carrot crops with non-host crops or fallow. In a 2000-2002 study, CarVY was found to be infecting carrot crops in all six Australian states. The virus infected 30 out of 36 tested carrot cultivars. The incidence was greater in states (New South Wales, South Australia, Victoria and Western Australia) where carrot production was continuous. Additionally, the virus is able to successfully infect and multiply when carrots are grown for seed production (in which the carrots are grown continuously for approximately two years). In states where carrot growing is restricted to the summer or winter months, the incidence of CarVY was greatly reduced. Incidence is much lower when crops are only grown for six months out of the year. The study illustrates that virus carryover can be greatly diminished when there is a break in carrot production.

=== Control ===
When it comes to the control of CarVY, the key measures include avoiding spread from nearby infected carrot crops, minimizing spread from volunteer carrots, and introducing non-host rotational crops. One of the easiest control methods is done by planting crops that are not in close proximity to each other. This avoids spread from potentially infected carrot crops. Additionally, the spread from volunteer carrot crops can be eliminated by spraying volunteer crops with herbicide, or deep ploughing before re-sowing the land with carrots. This removes potential virus infection sources and prevents them from spreading to new plantings. Another control method consists of manipulating the planting date of carrot crops in order to avoid exposure to peak aphid populations. When plants are at their most vulnerable growth stage, the symptoms of the virus become more severe as the crops develop. Avoiding peak aphid populations reduces the chance of infection at early growth stages, as plants infected later produce less damaged carrots.

== Associated viruses ==
CarVY is most closely related to Celery mosaic virus.
