= Clover yellow vein virus =

Virus classification
- (unranked): Virus
- Realm: Riboviria
- Kingdom: Orthornavirae
- Phylum: Pisuviricota
- Class: Stelpaviricetes
- Order: Patatavirales
- Family: Potyviridae
- Genus: Potyvirus
- Species: Potyvirus trifolii

Species of virus

Clover yellow vein virus (ClYVV) is a pathogenic plant virus in the genus Potyvirus and the family Potyviridae. Like other members of the Potyvirus genus, ClYVV is a monopartite strand of positive-sense, single-stranded RNA surrounded by a capsid made for a single viral encoded protein. The virus is a filamentous particle that measures about 760 nm in length. This virus is transmitted by several species of aphids in a nonpersistent manner and by mechanical inoculation.

== Geographic distribution and host range ==
Clover yellow vein virus, first named in 1965, was isolated from white clover (Trifolium repens) in a garden in England. A survey of English pastures found it to be widespread throughout England. In 1969, a similar virus was isolated in Canada and it was speculated at the time that the virus was also common in the United States but had been misidentified as a strain of Bean yellow mosaic virus (BYMV). With time, using serological, host range studies and eventually sequence data, this proved to be true. For example, several species of Commelinaceae, reported to be infected by BYMV, were found susceptible to ClYVV instead. ClYVV and BYMV are now considered to be different potyviruses, both of which infect many members of the Fabaceae (or Leguminosae) worldwide.
