= Nicola Spence =

British biologist

Nicola Spence CBE
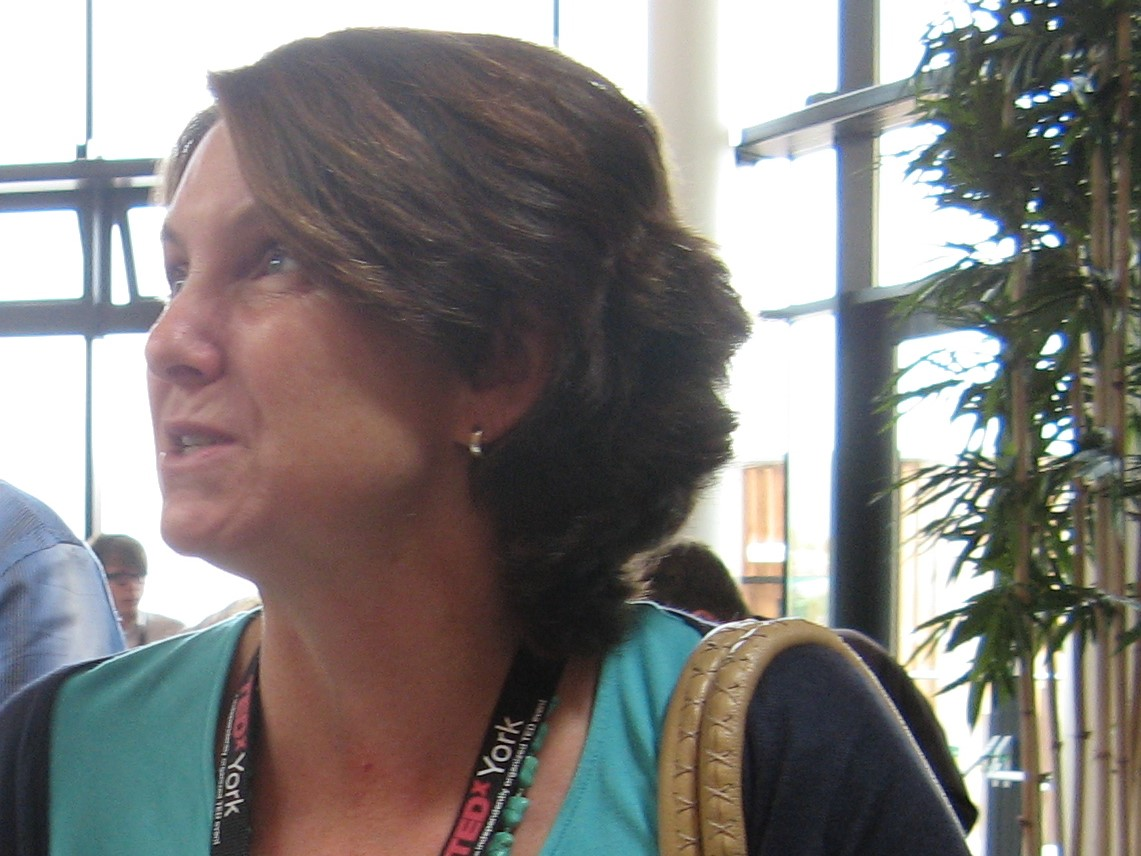
- Nicola Spence at Tedx, York in 2011
- Born: 22 February 1961
- Education: University of Durham (BSc), Birkbeck College (MSc), University of Birmingham (PhD)
- Known for: Chief Plant Health Officer, Defra
- Scientific career
- Fields: Plant pathology, plant health
- Institutions: Warwick HRI, Food and Environment Research Agency, Defra
- Thesis: The identification, distribution and ecology of bean common mosaic virus in Africa (1992)

Nicola Jane Spence CBE (born 22 February 1961) is the Chief Plant Health Officer and Deputy Director for plant and bee health at the Department for Environment, Food and Rural Affairs.

== Early life and education ==
Spence was educated at The Mount School, York and Bridlington School. She obtained a BSc degree in Botany from the University of Durham. Before starting her Master's degree, Spence volunteered at the Bermuda Marine Biology Research Institute then worked as a tutor for O level and A level students, and was unsure whether she wanted to pursue a career in research. Spence undertook an MSc degree in Microbiology from Birkbeck College, which she states 'turned out to be the best decision I made at the start of my career.' Spence then obtained a PhD degree in Plant Virology from the University of Birmingham; her thesis was entitled The identification, distribution and ecology of bean common mosaic virus in Africa.

In December 2018 Spence represented the University of Birmingham on the Christmas edition of University Challenge.

== Scientific research ==
Spence was a scientific researcher in plant virology at Horticulture Research International and Fera. She has researched viral diseases of crops and horticulture both in Africa and the UK.

Her research into viral diseases of crops in Africa has included investigations into the pathogenicity of bean common mosaic virus and its occurrence in legumes in Uganda. She has also published on the economic impact of turnip mosaic virus, cauliflower mosaic virus and beet mosaic virus in Kenya and patterns of plant pest introductions into Europe and Africa. She was the vegetables technical advisor for the Department for International Development's crop protection programme, leading projects on management of viral diseases in vegetable crops in Kenya and promotion of quality kale seed in Kenya.

In UK horticultural systems, Spence has worked on identifying viruses present in Alstroemeria crops in the UK, as well as isolating and characterising viruses from petunia and Cineraria. Other research included studying the effect of pepino mosaic virus on tomato yield. She was an editor and contributor to the book Biotic Interactions in Plant-pathogen Associations. and she was previously a member of the editorial board for the scientific journal Plant Pathology.

Spence was appointed chief scientist at Fera in 2009.

== Science City York ==
In 2009 Spence was appointed the chief executive of Science City York, later known as SCY, an organisation supporting the development of science and technology industries in York, England. In this role, Spence promoted connections between academics and local businesses, managing events such as Venturefest. She was key in the development of the concept of the BioVale, which aims to promote the bioeconomy in Yorkshire and the Humber. She remained in the role for four years, until her appointment as Chief Plant Health Officer.

== Chief Plant Health Officer ==
Spence took up her post as chief plant health officer in April 2014, and later also became deputy director for plant and bee health.

Spence has made several media appearances in relation to her work at Defra. In April 2016 she appeared on the Today Programme to discuss the finding of a resistant ash tree in Norfolk, and has also appeared on the BBC's Countryfile programme. She has also been a guest on Farming Today discussing tree diseases in the UK. In 2016, she was involved in the management of the Asian hornet outbreak response, and appeared on the World at One to explain Asian hornet biology and the Defra response to the outbreak.

In 2017, in response to the Xylella fastidiosa outbreak in several European countries, Spence wrote to the horticulture sector urging them to follow the example of those which had committed not to bring in host plants from the affected countries. In 2018, she was a guest and speaker at summit examining the risks posed by Xylella to the horticulture industry hosted by Prince Charles.

In May 2018, Spence gave evidence to the EU Select Committee on Brexit and the potential implications for plant health.

Whilst at Defra, Spence has been active in promoting plant health as a career. In conjunction with the Royal Society of Biology and Charles Lane at Fera Science, Spence developed the Plant Health Professional Register – a way for those working in the area of plant health to gain a formal recognition of their professional skills and continue their professional development. She worked with Harper Adams University to put together a course on plant biosecurity, and is a visiting professor at the university.

Spence was appointed Commander of the Order of the British Empire (CBE) in the 2022 New Year Honours for services to plant health.

== Other roles ==
Spence has previously served on the Board of Trustees for Kew Gardens. She is currently a Trustee for The Yorkshire Arboretum and a Fellow of the Royal Society of Biology.

Spence is a visiting professor in plant pathology at Harper Adams University. She sits on the board of governors at her former school in York, The Mount. and a member of the University of York Court. She was Vice-President of the British Society for Plant Pathology. Spence is chair of the management board of the CONNECTED project that aims to tackle vector borne plant diseases in Africa.
