= Narcissus late season yellows virus =

Virus classification
- (unranked): Virus
- Realm: Riboviria
- Kingdom: Orthornavirae
- Phylum: Pisuviricota
- Class: Stelpaviricetes
- Order: Patatavirales
- Family: Potyviridae
- Genus: Potyvirus
- Species: Potyvirus narcissuslineae

Species of virus

Narcissus late season yellows virus (NLSYV) is a plant virus of the genus Potyvirus in the family Potyviridae which infects plants of the genus Narcissus. It was originally isolated from N. pseudonarcissus in 1977.

== Description ==
Transmitted by aphids, it is one of the most widespread potyvirus infections in United Kingdom stocks. The infection is referred to as late season yellows disease, coming on after flowering, hence 'late', with chlorotic streaks of leaves and stem that are sharply defined and pale green to yellow. The flowers are not affected. It is not transmitted to other genera.

== Bibliography ==
- Brunt, A.A. (1980). Acta Hort. 110: 23.
- MOWAT, W. P.; DUNCAN, G. H.; DAWSON, SHEILA (December 1988). "Narcissus late season yellows potyvirus: symptoms, properties and serological detection". Annals of Applied Biology. 113 (3): 531–544. doi:10.1111/j.1744-7348.1988.tb03330.x.
