= Narcissus yellow stripe virus =

Virus classification
- (unranked): Virus
- Realm: Riboviria
- Kingdom: Orthornavirae
- Phylum: Pisuviricota
- Class: Stelpaviricetes
- Order: Patatavirales
- Family: Potyviridae
- Genus: Potyvirus
- Species: Potyvirus narcissus

Synonyms
- Narcissus yellow streak virus

Species of virus

Narcissus yellow stripe potyvirus (NYSV) is a plant virus of the genus Potyvirus in the family Potyviridae which infects plants of the genus Narcissus. It is one of the commoner viruses infecting Narcissus, and is transmitted by aphids.

Infection with NYSV produces light or grayish green, or yellow stripes or mottles on the upper two-thirds of the leaf, which may be roughened or twisted. The flowers which may be smaller than usual may also be streaked or blotched.

== Bibliography ==
- King, Andrew M. Q.; et al., eds. (2012). Virus taxonomy : classification and nomenclature of viruses : ninth report of the International Committee on Taxonomy of Viruses. London: Academic Press. p. 926. ISBN 978-0123846846.
- "Virus Taxonomy: 2013 Release". International Committee on Taxonomy of Viruses (ICTV). 2014.
