= Pea seed-borne mosaic virus =

Virus classification
- (unranked): Virus
- Realm: Riboviria
- Kingdom: Orthornavirae
- Phylum: Pisuviricota
- Class: Stelpaviricetes
- Order: Patatavirales
- Family: Potyviridae
- Genus: Potyvirus
- Species: Potyvirus pisumsemenportati

Synonyms
- Pea fizzle top virus Pea leaf rolling virus Pea leaf roll mosaic virus Pea leaf rolling mosaic virus

Pathogenic virus

Pea seed-borne mosaic virus (PSbMV) is a plant virus of the family Potyviridae.
