= Lily mottle virus =

Virus classification
- (unranked): Virus
- Realm: Riboviria
- Kingdom: Orthornavirae
- Phylum: Pisuviricota
- Class: Stelpaviricetes
- Order: Patatavirales
- Family: Potyviridae
- Genus: Potyvirus
- Species: Potyvirus lilimaculae

Species of virus

Lily mottle virus (LMoV) is a plant virus of the Potyviridae virus family that causes asymptomatic to mild diseases of individual plant parts in plants of the lily family (Liliaceae). However, a frequently occurring simultaneous infection with other plant viruses, which on their own only cause moderate or no disease, can cause an entire plant to perish. This coinfection leads to considerable crop damage in lily cultivation and is therefore of great economic importance. Lily mottle virus is spread by aphids and in horticulture during vegetative propagation by splitting the lily bulb. LMoV was regarded as a synonym for a subtype of the Tulip breaking virus (TBV) that occurs in lilies, although since 2005 it has been classified as a closely related but independent virus species of the genus Potyvirus.

== Discovery ==
The symptoms of the plant disease caused by LMoV were already known in the 19th century. Yet it was not until 1944 that P. Brierley and F. F. Smith succeeded in proving a coinfection with two viruses as the cause through infection experiments on several tulip and lily species. They were able to detect the Lily symptomless virus (LSV, order Tymovirales: Betaflexiviridae: Carlavirus) in several lily species grown in the USA (Lilium auratum, L. speciosum, L. longiflorum), which showed streaky brightening (chlorosis) or individual necrotic spots on the leaves, which was always present simultaneously with the Cucumber mosaic virus (CMV) or the Lily mottle virus. They were also able to demonstrate that all three viruses are transmitted by aphids of the species Aphis gossypii.

== Virus structure ==
=== Morphology ===
Virus particles (virions) of the Lily mottle virus consist of a thread-like capsid with helical symmetry, in which a single-stranded RNA is packed as a genome; a viral envelope is not present. The capsid is 13 nm thick and about 740 nm long. The length of the capsid increases in the presence of divalent cations (especially calcium ions) in the preparation and decreases after binding by the addition of EDTA. The individual capsomeres that make up the capsid require a pitch of 3.4 nm for one helix turn. Compared to viruses with rigid rods and a comparable structure (e.g. the Tobacco mosaic virus- TMV), this duct height is relatively large and enables the LMoV capsid to be flexible and bendable. One turn requires 7.7 capsomeres, so that the entire capsid is composed of about 1700 capsomeres. The individual capsomeres consist of only one molecule of the LMoV capsid protein (CP, coat/capsid protein) with a length of 274 amino acids (33 kDa). The CP is folded several times in such a way that the N- and C-terminus point outwards. These outer ends of the capsid protein are very variable. The protruding N-terminus mainly determines the specific attachment to the host cell and enables the serological differentiation of different virus isolates. The highly conserved sections in the middle of the CP (216 amino acids) within the different members of the Potyviridae point inwards in the capsid and interact with the viral RNA.

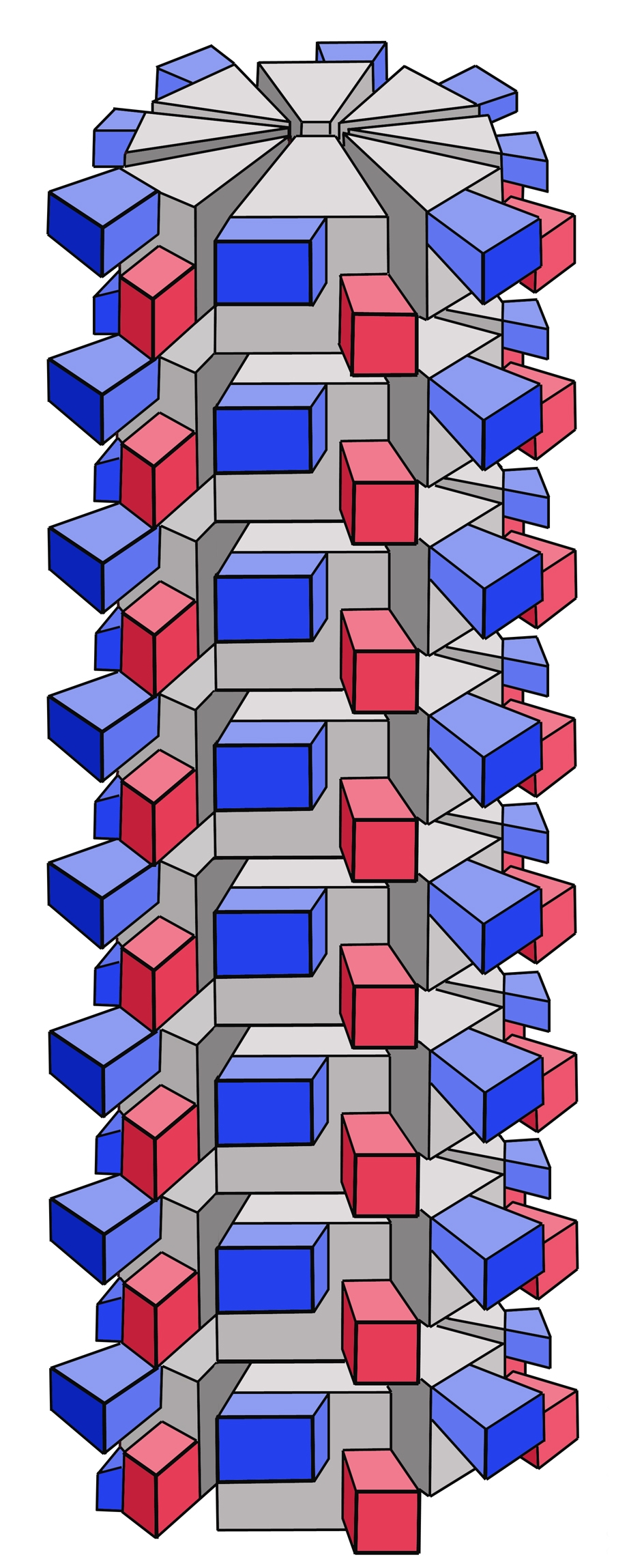
Schematic structure of the LMoV capsid (section with eight helix turns). Conserved areas of the capsid protein (gray), N-terminus (blue) and C-terminus (red)

The virions are stable against ethanol and lose their infectivity in the plant sap only after 10 minutes at 65-70 °C. The LMoV has a density of 1.31 g/ml in density gradient centrifugation (caesium chloride) and a sedimentation coefficient of 137 to 160 S.

=== Genome ===
The genome of LMoV is a linear, single-stranded RNA with positive polarity [(+)ssRNA] and a length of 9644 nucleotides. A viral protein (VPg) is covalently bound to the 5'-end of the RNA. As with cellular messenger RNAs, a poly(A) tail of 20 to 160 adenosines is located at the 3' end of the viral genome. Between the two non-coding ends (NCR: non-coding region) is an open reading frame (ORF), which codes for a polyprotein of 3095 amino acids. This polyprotein is cleaved into the individual viral proteins by proteases during translation.

An IRES structure was suspected in the 5'-NCR of potyviruses, as translation is initiated without a 5'-cap structure. LMoV does not have a cap structure, nor could an IRES be confirmed from sequence data. The VPg protein bound to the 5'-NCR possibly serves as a primer for the RNA polymerase to amplify the RNA. However, the VPg of other potyviruses also interacts directly with the translation initiation factors eIF4E and eIFiso4E. This could represent an as yet uncharacterized, Cap- and IRES-independent translation pathway.

=== Virus proteins and replication ===
After infection, the virus enters the plant via the vascular bundle and is taken up by the cells through membrane vesicles (endocytosis). In the cytoplasm, the capsid disintegrates and the RNA is released. The viral RNA can also enter the cell very effectively via infected neighboring cells through cell contact sites (plasmodesmata). This direct transport of naked, infectious RNA is controlled by several viral proteins, including the so-called HC (helper component), which form a so-called movement complex. As with all (+)ssRNA viruses, the ingested RNA is first translated into protein at the ribosomes, as at least one copy of the viral RNA-dependent RNA polymerase is required for the replication of the RNA. After this has synthesized several copies of the viral RNA, the LMoV proteins are produced in large quantities. These accumulate at the synthesis sites of the viroplasm to form morphologically visible inclusion bodies. When infected with LMoV, these inclusion bodies have a characteristic, cylindrical to spiral-like shape in the cytoplasm; the virus protein that predominantly forms these cylinders is therefore also referred to as CI (cylindrical inclusion). Amorphous inclusion bodies are formed in the cell nucleus, which consist of two viral proteins NIa and NIb (nuclear inclusions). As the viral proteins are always formed in the same ratio during translation of the RNA and larger quantities of the capsid protein are required in comparison to other proteins, these proteins, which are not required in many copies, form inclusion bodies, are degraded or excreted from the cell.

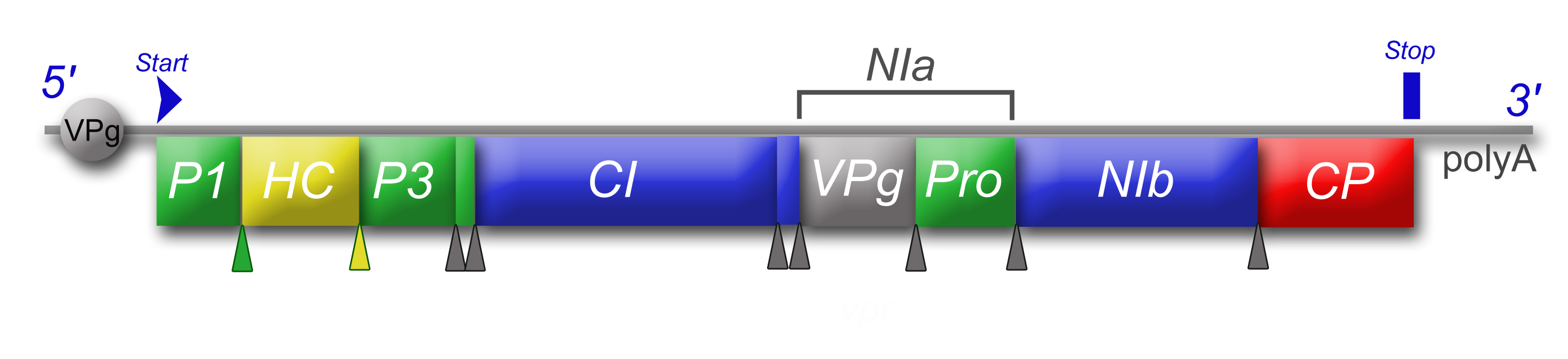
Genome organization of LMoV: P1(protease 1), HC (helper component), P3 (protease 3), CI (cylindrical inclusions protein), VPg (genomic virus protein), Pro (protease), NI (nuclear inclusions protein), CP(capsid/coat protein). The interfaces of the proteases are shown as wedges.

The LMoV polyprotein is cleaved into eight individual proteins by viral proteases. At the N-terminus, viral protease 1 (P1) cleaves itself from the polyprotein. Next comes the HC protein, which is important for transmission by aphids; however, the mechanism is unclear. The HC has a papain-like protein domain at the C-terminus, with which the HC also splits off independently from the polyprotein. All other proteins are cleaved by the NIa protease. This is followed by a further protease (P3) with an as yet unknown function and the CI, from which a small peptide 6K1 is cleaved (possibly for activation). The CI is active as a helicase during RNA replication. Together with a protease component, the VPg forms the NIa. The NIb is the viral RNA polymerase from which the viral capsid protein CP is cleaved. Once sufficient viral (+)ssRNA and CP have been formed, packaging into the capsid can take place and mature viruses can be released into the plant sap by exocytosis. The much more effective infection of the naked RNA from cell to cell explains the appearance of patchy lesions on the leaves.

== Classification ==
The genus Potyvirus is currently the largest group of all plant viruses with 168 virus species. This large number of Potyviruses makes it difficult to distinguish and delimit individual species or subtypes, especially the Lily mottle virus and the Tulip breaking virus (TBV), which were long considered synonyms of a single species. LMoV was regarded as the subtype of TBV (TBV subtype Lily) that was widespread in lilies. This distinction was made even more complex by the fact that the true species TBV can also cause disease in lilies. With more and more comparative sequences of the genome of different virus isolates, incorrect assignments have so far been detected. In a study of 187 complete genome sequences and 1220 partial sequences for the capsid protein of potyviruses, several subgroups within the genus were identified and the criteria for the species limits were also redefined for LMoV and TBV. Accordingly, a match in the nucleotide sequence between two complete genomes of more than 76% is considered a species limit (corresponds to 82% match in the amino acid sequence). The part of the nucleotide sequence coding for the capsid protein CP showed a species limit of 76-77%. The sequence of the CI protein appeared to be the most suitable for differentiation. Several sequences of potyviruses (including TBV and LMoV), which were published in the international gene bank GenBank, had to be assigned to other species as a result.

The taxonomy defined by the "International Committee on Taxonomy of Viruses" and valid since 2005 includes subtypes of LMoV previously classified as TBV:

- Family Potyviridae

- Genus Potyvirus

- Species Potyvirus lilimaculae

- Subtype Lily-Mild-Mottle-Virus
- Subtype Lily-Mottle-Virus
- Subtype Tulip-band-breaking-Virus

== Infection and disease caused by LMoV ==
About two weeks after being infected with LMoV, a light green mottle appears on young leaves. The discoloration can also appear in stripes along the leaf veins. Over the course of a few days, the leaf becomes thinner in the light spots and in severe cases the plant cells can die in these areas; the irregularly defined spots now appear dark brown and dried out. All new shoots and flowers that sprout after infection are reduced in size and often deformed.

However, the severity of the disease symptoms varies greatly between different lily species and hybrids. Even the disease of identical species in a single cultivation area varies in severity. This phenomenon can be explained by the influence of the growth phase at the time of infection, the point of entry and the infectious dose of the virus. In the Easter lily (L. longiflorum), no disease regularly develops, although the virus multiplies in the plant. In the tiger lily (L. lancifolium), only a very slight light green mottling occurs. In some LMoV infections, only reduced length growth and smaller flowers and bulbs can be observed. The economically important species L. formosanum always falls ill after an LMoV infection; this also applies to the wild varieties found in Taiwan. Only the specially selected variety Lilium formosanum "Little Snow White" has increased virus resistance. Very susceptible to LMoV and other plant viruses found in lilies is the hybrid "Enchantment" bred by Jan de Graaff in 1941 and all cultivars derived from it, such as the cultivar Lilium Asia. Hybrid cv. Enchantment.

Infection with LMoV alone never leads to the death of the entire plant, but remains locally limited to some parts of the plant. However, a coinfection of LMoV with Lily symptomless virus is particularly common, which alone does not cause any symptoms of the disease, but only reduced plant growth. If a plant is infected by both viruses, the disease progresses much more severely and quickly. After the initial typical symptoms of a pronounced LMoV infection, larger vascular bundles such as the entire phloem are affected, which ultimately causes the entire plant to die. A double-infected lily bulb can already be severely damaged during storage, lose its ability to sprout and die.

== Transmission and spread ==
=== Transmission ===
The Lily Mottle virus is transmitted during the feeding act of aphids (Aphididae). The aphids ingest the virus, which is present in high concentrations in the plant sap, during the feeding act and can infect other plants with a delay of a few hours. The virus cannot multiply in the aphid itself. After absorption of the plant sap into the aphid's midgut, the virus is distributed in the bloodstream and enters the saliva of the sucking apparatus; a new plant can then be infected during the next feeding. The aphid species that predominantly transmit LMoV are Aphis gossypii, Myzus persicae, Macrosiphum euphorbiae and Doralis fabae. Stored bulbs can also be infected with the virus by Anuraphis (Yezabura) tulipae. Winged specimens of the aphid population enable transmission over long distances.

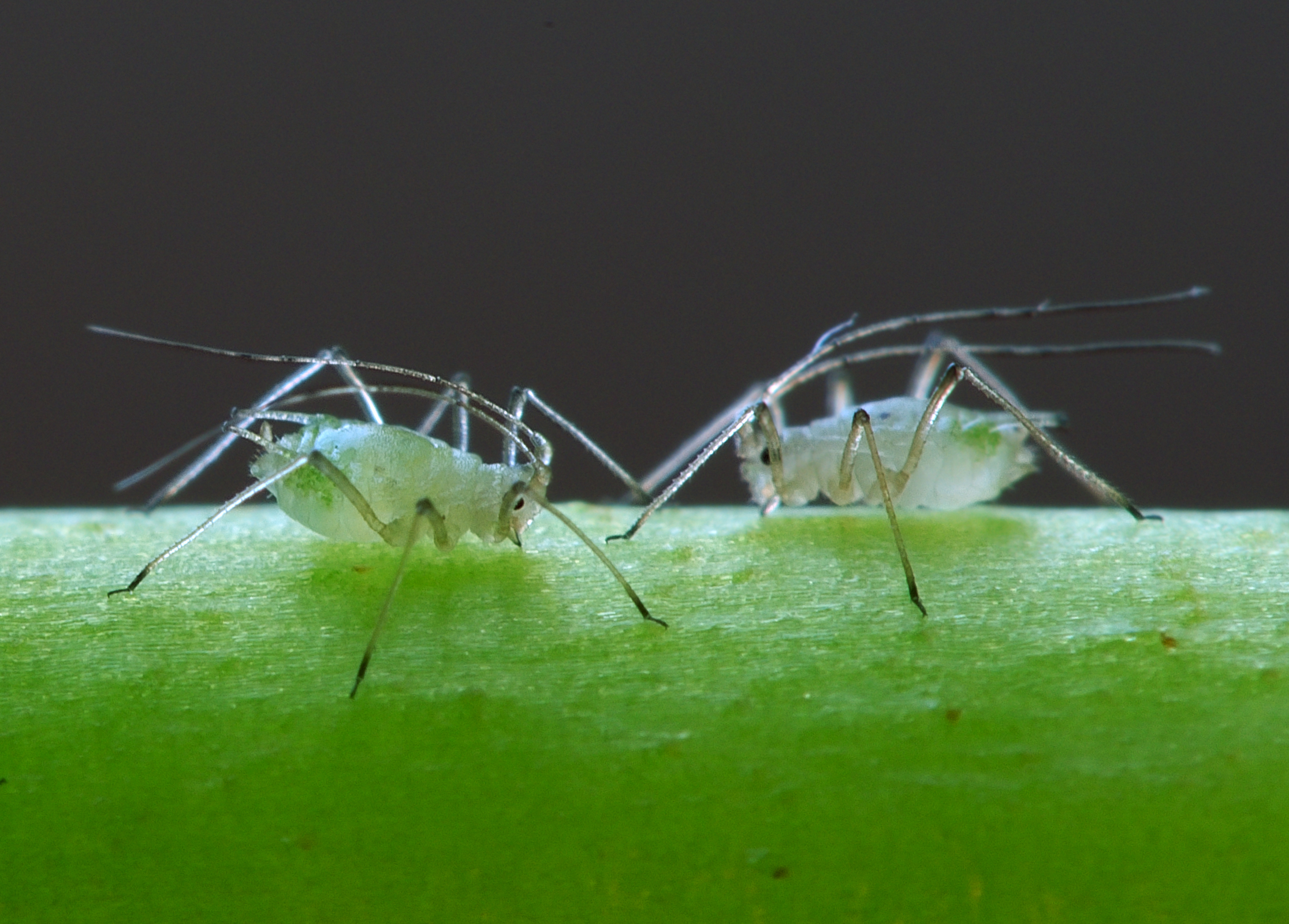
Reed aphids ingesting plant sap

During plant cultivation, the virus is transmitted when the plants are cut and injured with contaminated knives and scissors. Experimentally, this route of infection is used by targeted scoring of the plants. Splitting the lily bulbs during vegetative propagation spreads the virus to all daughter plants. The same applies to vegetative propagation by cuttings in tissue culture, which is very common in industrial horticulture. The virus is not spread by seeds; if a new plant germinates from the seed of an LMoV-infected plant, it is not infected.

=== Distribution ===
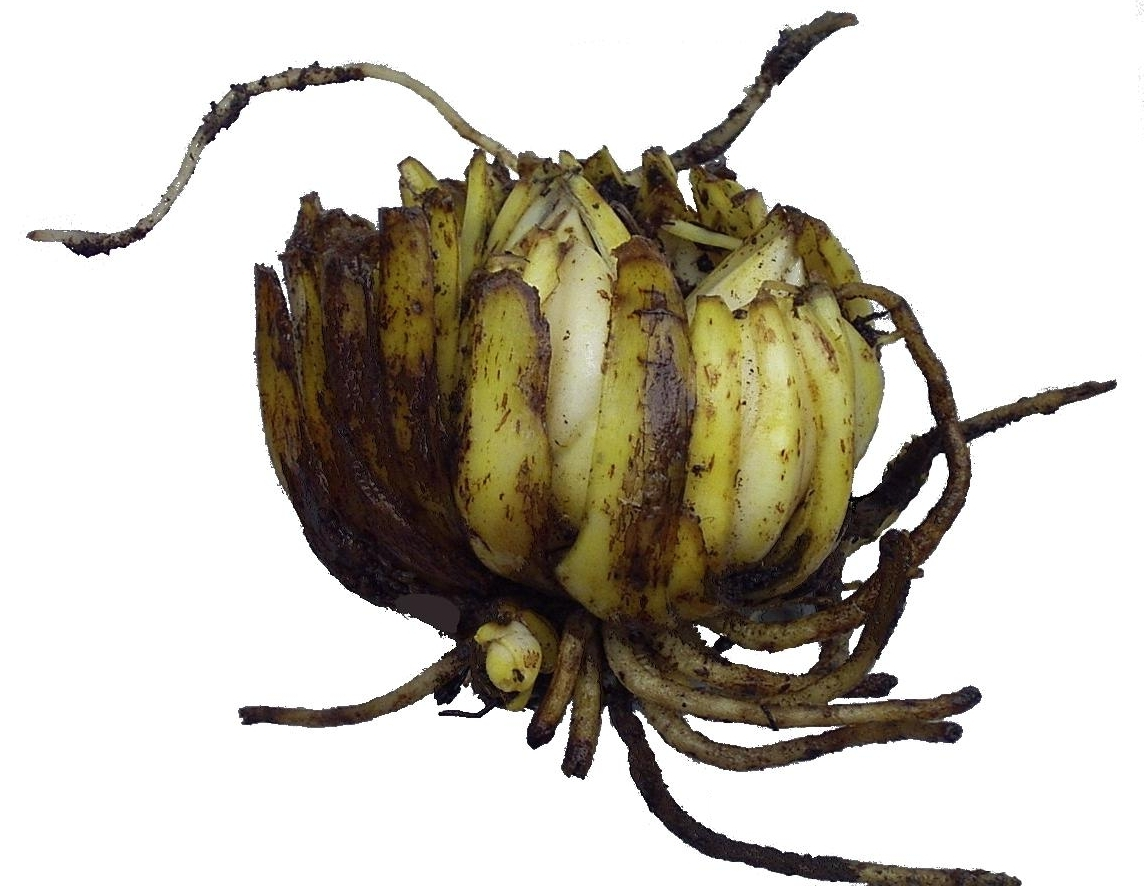
Bulb of a Lilium sp.

The natural geographical spread of the virus is not known, as when it was discovered in the US in 1944, it was already being spread by man through the global trade in flowers and bulbs. The cultivation of lilies in large greenhouses and fields as a monoculture particularly favors transmission compared to the natural occurrence of wild plants. The virus is spread worldwide and is endemic in countries with significant lily cultivation. In addition to the United States, this includes the Netherlands, Poland, North and South Korea, Japan, Taiwan, China and Israel. The Lily mild mottle virus, a subtype of LMoV, was detected in 26.3% of all plants in a study of 185 lily samples from South Korean crops, and a co-infection of LMoV and the Tomato ringspot virus was observed in a further 23.2%.

In the Netherlands, LMoV was detected several times in all plants of individual lily fields of the cultivar "Enchantment". Often there was also an infection with the Lily symptomless virus. In plantations affected in this way, necrosis of the stem and leaves is increasingly observed, which is usually followed by the death of the plant. If all the lilies in a plantation are only infected with LMoV, this does not usually result in the loss of the entire flower crop; smaller flowers or plants with reduced growth are then offered at lower prices.

LMoV was detected in all of the approximately 340 lily cultivars grown on a large scale. The undetected spread through worldwide transportation is particularly prevalent in those lily species that show no or only minor symptoms of infection, but can propagate the virus, such as the Easter lily and Tiger lily. The virus has a wider host range than was assumed in earlier studies. For example, LMoV was also detected in the winter endive (C. endivia L. var. latifolium Lam.).

== Prevention of the infection ==
The spread of LMoV in industrial production is primarily prevented by controlling the aphids as carriers. The virus is mainly transmitted by spreading aphid populations in June and July, less so in May and August. Weekly control of the insects from May and biweekly in August and September is carried out on an industrial scale. The lilies are most often treated with kerosene oil or pyrethroids as aerosols.

To prevent infection, it is important to avoid further spread through seed bulbs and the global plant trade. Those lily species with no or only mild symptoms are a particular source of infection outbreaks, as the infection remains undetected. For this reason, the simultaneous cultivation of resistant and susceptible lily varieties is often avoided, as the virus can spread unnoticed in the resistant varieties without developing disease symptoms. These form a permanent reservoir for the infection of the susceptible varieties. In a monoculture of susceptible varieties, infected plants can be sorted out and thus the spread of the virus can be controlled to a certain extent. As the virus is not transmitted by seed like other members of the Potyvirus genus, a crop can be freed from infection with LMoV by more complex, renewed breeding from seed.

The transportation and trade of plant parts such as flowers, cuttings or bulbs from cultivation areas in which LMoV has been detected is subject to legal restrictions or an import ban in many countries. In particular, plant parts traded for propagation and breeding have had to be tested for LMoV in Germany since 1998 in accordance with the implementation of several EU directives. To detect LMoV, immunological tests for LMoV virus proteins (ELISA) and, rarely, detection of the virus genome by PCR are used. Both the leaves ("leaf test") and the harvested bulbs ("bulb test") are used as test samples for diagnostics. Newer methods for the simultaneous detection of several plant viruses from one sample by DNA hybridization (macroarray) are currently being tested.
