= Tobacco vein mottling virus =

Virus classification
- (unranked): Virus
- Realm: Riboviria
- Kingdom: Orthornavirae
- Phylum: Pisuviricota
- Class: Stelpaviricetes
- Order: Patatavirales
- Family: Potyviridae
- Genus: Potyvirus
- Species: Potyvirus nicotianavenamaculae

Species of virus

Tobacco vein mottling virus (TVMV) is a plant virus of the family Potyviridae, first described in 1972. It is found in the United States in tobacco plants. It is spread between plants by aphids.
