= Narcissus degeneration virus =

Virus classification
- (unranked): Virus
- Realm: Riboviria
- Kingdom: Orthornavirae
- Phylum: Pisuviricota
- Class: Stelpaviricetes
- Order: Patatavirales
- Family: Potyviridae
- Genus: Potyvirus
- Species: Potyvirus narcissusdegeneris

Species of virus

Narcissus degeneration virus (NDV) is a plant virus of the genus Potyvirus in the family Potyviridae which infects plants of the genus Narcissus. It is one of the most serious and prevalent of the approximately 21 viruses which infect this genus. NDV is associated with chlorotic leaf striping in N. tazetta.

== Bibliography ==
- Rina Kamenetsky, Hiroshi Okubo, ed. (2012). Ornamental Geophytes: From Basic Science to Sustainable Production. CRC Press. ISBN 978-1-4398-4924-8.
- "Daffodil (Narcissus spp.)-Virus Diseases". Pacific Northwest Plant Disease Management Handbook. Oregon State University. 2014. Archived from the original on 17 December 2014.
