= Johnsongrass mosaic virus =

Virus classification
- (unranked): Virus
- Realm: Riboviria
- Kingdom: Orthornavirae
- Phylum: Pisuviricota
- Class: Stelpaviricetes
- Order: Patatavirales
- Family: Potyviridae
- Genus: Potyvirus
- Species: Potyvirus halapensis

Strains
- Guinea grass mosaic virus; Johnsongrass mosaic virus

Synonyms
- Maize dwarf mosaic virus — strain O; Sugarcane mosaic virus; Australian Johnson grass virus; Maize dwarf mosaic virus — Kansas I strain

Species of virus

Johnsongrass mosaic virus (JGMV) is a plant virus of the family Potyviridae.
