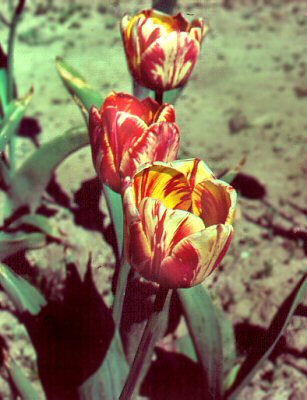

Virus classification
- (unranked): Virus
- Realm: Riboviria
- Kingdom: Orthornavirae
- Phylum: Pisuviricota
- Class: Stelpaviricetes
- Order: Patatavirales
- Family: Potyviridae
- Genus: Potyvirus
- Species: Potyvirus tulipadefractum

Strains
- mild tulip breaking virus (MTBV); severe tulip breaking virus (STBV)

= Tulip breaking virus =

Potyvirus tulipadefractum

Species of virus

Tulip breaking virus (Note: Taxonomical species names were updated by the International Committee on Taxonomy of Viruses in June 2024, with Tulip breaking virus being renamed Potyvirus tulipadefractum.) is one of five plant viruses of the family Potyviridae that cause color-breaking of tulip flowers. These viruses infect plants in only two genera of the family Liliaceae: tulips (Tulipa) and lilies (Lilium).

Also known as the tulip break virus, lily streak virus, lily mosaic virus, or simply TBV, tulip breaking virus is most famous for its dramatic effects on the color of the tulip perianth, an effect highly sought after during the 17th-century Dutch "tulip mania".

Tulip breaking virus is a potyvirus. A distant serological relationship between Tulip breaking virus and Tobacco etch virus was discovered in 1971.

Tulip breaking virus (TBV), tulip top-breaking virus (TTBV), tulip bandbreaking virus (TBBV), Rembrandt tulip-breaking virus (ReTBV), and lily mottle virus (LMoV) have all been identified as potyviruses by serology and potyvirus-specific polymerase chain reaction (PCR). In addition, sequence analysis of amplified DNA fragments has classified them all as distinct viruses or strains; recently TTBV has been found to be strain-related to turnip mosaic virus.

== Effects of the virus ==
The virus infects the bulb and causes the cultivar to "break" its lock on a single color, resulting in intricate bars, stripes, streaks, featherings or flame-like effects of different colors on the petals. These symptoms vary depending on the plant variety and age at the time of infection. Different types of colour-breaks depend on the variety of tulip and the strain of the virus. The color variegation is caused either by local fading, or intensification and overaccumulation of pigments in the vacuoles of the upper epidermal layer due to the irregular distribution of anthocyanin; this fluctuation in pigmentation occurs after the normal flower color has developed. Because each outer surface is affected, the two sides of the petal often display different patterns.

In the lily species, the virus causes mild to moderate mottling or streaking in the leaves about two weeks after inoculation, and then causes the plant to produce distorted leaves and flowers.

The virus also weakens the bulb and retards the plant's propagation through offset growths; as it progresses through each generation the bulb grows stunted and weak. Eventually it has no strength to flower, and either breaks apart or withers away, ending the genetic line. For this reason the most famous examples of tulips from color-break bulbs – the Semper Augustus and the Viceroy – no longer exist.

== History ==
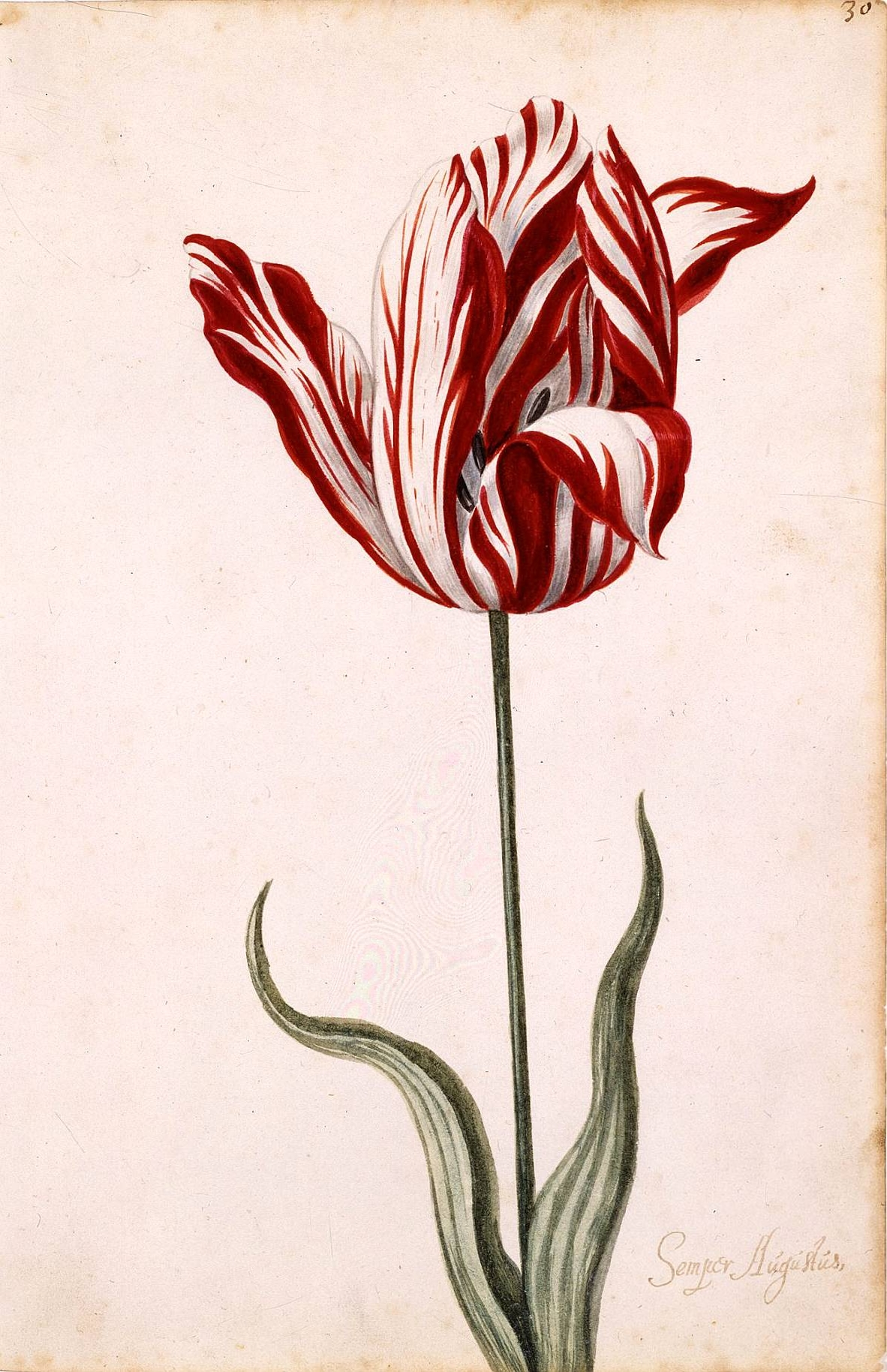
Gouache on paper drawing, before 1640, of the Semper Augustus, famous for being the most expensive tulip sold during tulip mania. The effects of Tulip breaking virus are clearly visible

Long thought to be the earliest recorded plant virus, it is now thought that TBV comes second; the earliest reference to a virus-induced leaf chlorosis (possibly tobacco leaf curl virus) was recorded in Japan in 752 AD.

"Breaking" symptomology was first described in 1576 by Carolus Clusius, a Flemish professor of Botany at Leiden, who noted the variegation, or "rectification", so termed because it was believed that with the offset production of an entirely new "broken" bloom the plant was distilling, or rectifying, itself into a pure life form.

Clusius's observations continued; in 1585, he was the first to note that "broken" plants also slowly degenerated. "... any tulip thus changing its original colour is usually ruined afterwards and so wanted only to delight its master's eyes with this variety of colours before dying, as if to bid him a last farewell." It was not known that the virus was responsible for this effect, so for centuries breeders believed that it was environmental conditions that attenuated the bulb and caused single colour tulips to break and streak. They tried to induce "rectification" through frequent soil changes (causing the bulb to go to seed); varying the planting depths so the plant had to struggle in too much or too little soil; applying too much or too little manure; using soil that was either too poor or too rich; or storing the bulbs in exposed conditions so that they would be 'acted' upon by the rain, wind, sun, and extremes of temperature. However, as early as 1637 Dutch growers were able to produce new broken varieties through bulb grafting, by combining "broken" bulbs infected with the virus with healthy bulbs that produced uniformly colored flowers.

At the end of the eighteenth century, the notion that "breaking" in tulips was a manifestation of some kind of chronic disorder or weakness in the bulb was certainly considered among botanists; but it was still more or less believed that adverse environmental conditions were to blame. A comment by William Hanbury in 1770 that: "All variegations are diseases in a plant and nothing is so proper to bring this about as a defect in nutriment." bears out this general attitude. Given the lack of knowledge of human infectious diseases at this time (and well into the 19th century) this was not an unusual conclusion, but what is surprising is that while tulip mosaic disease has a far more impressive and documented history than any other plant virus, the realization that it was a communicable plant disease, let alone a virus, came surprisingly late – a decade after the end of World War I. "Plant virus" to plant pathologists at the time was almost synonymous with the tobacco mosaic virus, which had been discovered in 1897, quite soon after bacteriology had become established as an academic subject. Since the prime characteristics of the tobacco mosaic virus are that it damages the leaves and flowers of the plant, stunts growth, and lowers quantity and quality of the crop, it is puzzling to many academics and scientists that twenty more years passed before "breaking" was even suspected of being virus-induced.

== Pathogen discovery ==
By the mid-1920s, biochemistry was coming into its own, and its impact was felt in virus research. Eventually, it was a series of bulb manipulation experiments begun in 1928 by Dorothy Cayley at the John Innes Horticultural Institution in Merton, South London, England that led to the discovery of the virus. The record of Cayley's experiments are held at the Institution's current location in Norfolk. Caley discovered that by mechanically transferring infected tissue from broken bulbs to healthy bulbs during their dormant state, the virus that caused the break in color would also be transferred. These experiments were further refined down to minute amounts, which led her to correctly conclude that the "virus or enzyme infection" was sap-transmissible, probably transferred by an insect, and the degree of breaking was proportional to the amount of infected tissue introduced.

The virus was eventually proved to be transferred in a non-persistent manner by at least four species of aphids, specifically Myzus persicae (the most efficient), Macrosiphum euphorbiae, Aphis fabae, and Aphis gossypii. McKenny-Hughes reported in 1934 that Dysaphis tulipae transmitted the virus between stored tulip bulbs, but this has not been confirmed. The transfer of the virus is non-persistent, which means it is accomplished through the insect feeding. In non-persistent transmission, viruses become attached to the distal tip of the stylet in the insect's mouthparts, so that the next plant it feeds on is inoculated with the virus. The virus does not affect the seed that produces a bulb, only the bulb itself, its leaves and blooms, and its daughter offsets.

It was not until the 1960s that TBV was shown to have flexuous filamentous particles (mostly measuring about 12×750 nm) and finally proved to be a virus. The genetic code of TBV has now been sequenced and the virus is recognized as a member of the genus Potyvirus (family Potyviridae). Understanding the genetic diversity of viruses that cause similar symptoms continues to be refined. Like other members of the genus it is now readily detected and identified by serological, molecular, and optical techniques.

== Viral strains ==
Two separate strains of the virus – Severe Tulip Breaking Virus (STBV) and Mild Tulip Breaking Virus (MTBV) – have been determined by the type and severity of the symptoms they cause. In certain varieties STBV causes full breaking or light breaking, when due to a lack of anthocyanin, pigment present in the surface chromoplast cells fades and the lighter color (white or yellow) of the internal mesophyll is exposed, appearing as irregular streaks or fine featherings. In the same varieties MTBV causes self breaking or dark breaking, which occurs because anthocyanins are formed in excess, so the color in the epidermal cells is intensified in dark streaks or elongated flecks and sworls. Breaking commonly occurs along the edges and tops of petals and sepals. The most common type of breaking found in naturally infected plants, called average break, is caused by infection with a mixture of STBV and MTBV; both light breaking and dark breaking symptoms are present, together with some unbroken areas, in different parts of the same petal. Plants infected with a mixture of strains when young may exhibit both effects, with light breaking symptoms restricted to the basal part of the petal and severe dark breaking effects in the upper parts. Some varieties were later found to be incapable of light breaking, and always showed dark breaking symptoms no matter whether infected with STBV or MTBV or a mixture of both strains. Although they still can be infected, white and yellow flowered varieties are incapable of breaking since they lack anthocyanins; their color is determined by colourless or yellow plastids in the mesophyll. Other outward symptoms can include leaf mottling.

== Distribution ==
Control of the virus is notoriously difficult. Its distribution is world-wide and had been reported in all temperate regions where tulips are grown; it is particularly common in southern Europe where the aphid vectors are abundant early in the growing season. Virus transmission by aphids causes millions of dollars of damage in the flower bulb sector annually. Mineral oils and pyrethroids are applied weekly during the growth season to decrease the virus transmission in flower bulbs, and current research projects are attempting to learn about the risk of non-persistent virus transmission in relation to aphid population dynamics.

Most recently, population dynamics of aphids in tulip fields were monitored during three growing seasons. Simultaneously, the period of TBV transmission by aphids was investigated experimentally by exposing small tulip plots during specified intervals to naturally occurring aphids. Finally, timing of virus spread was correlated with aphid population dynamics and weather conditions. In 2007 it was discovered that TBV transmission started in April, while the first aphids were not found until May. Apparently, the first aphids of the season had already contributed, in great extent, to the virus transmission, which was observed locally in the tulip plots. In addition, a second, but distinct, TBV isolate was identified, which resulted in the design of an improved TBV detection assay. These results should enable formulation of crop protection guidelines that are fine-tuned with the risk of virus transmission, which will help decrease environmental damage caused by pesticides.

In an effort to restrict the virus, the United States, Great Britain and other countries prohibit the commercial sale of broken bulbs, or bulbs known to be infected by the virus. As TBV-infected bulbs gradually degenerate, the virus can be minimized by removing and destroying 'broken' bulbs quickly before aphids spread the virus to other bulbs or cross-contaminating lily hosts.

== Broken tulips today ==
Today, tulips like Rem's Sensation displaying a "broken" effect are the result of artificial selection, not viral infection, although many tulip fanciers feel these "modern" variants are a poor substitute when compared to long-extinct cultivars like Semper Augustus. Modern tulip varieties that become infected with this virus tend to become weak and stunted. There are only a few varieties of older, truly "broken" tulips still in existence such as Zomerschoon, but only because the worst aspects of the virus have somehow not activated. One such example is the rare Absalon, which dates from 1780; a "bizarre" colored variety, it displays gold flames against a dark chocolate brown background.
