= Passion fruit (disambiguation) =

The passion fruit (Passiflora edulis) is a vine species of passion flower that is native to South America.

Passion fruit or Passionfruit may also refer to:

- Passion fruit (fruit), the fruit of a number of plants in the Passiflora family

== Film and TV ==
- Passion Fruit (film), a lost 1921 silent film
- Fruits of Passion, a 1981 French-Japanese co-production

== Music ==
- Passion Fruit (group), a German Eurodance/bubblegum dance group

=== Albums ===
- Passion Fruits, 1994 composition and album by Danish composer Sven Erik Werner
- Passionfruit (album), a 1983 jazz vocal album by Michael Franks

=== Songs ===
- "Passionfruit" (song), a 2017 song by Canadian hip-hop artist Drake
- "Passion Fruit" (song), a 2007 song by the Japanese group Fujifabric
- "Passion Fruit", a song from the 1977 Lou Donaldson album Color as a Way of Life
- "Passion Fruit", a song from the 1990 The Rippingtons Welcome to the St. James' Club
- "Passion Fruit", a 1984 song by the Shillelagh Sisters
- "Passion Fruit", B-side of "Take Me In" by Bonnie Pink
- "Passion Fruit", a song by Danny! from the 2006 album Dream, Interrupted
- "Passionfruit", a song by NMIXX from the 2024 EP Fe3O4: Break

== Other uses ==
- Passion Fruit (character), a character in The Annoying Orange series
- Passion fruit woodiness virus, a plant pathogenic virus
- Passionfruit, poetry collective Mark Beech, Jen Saunders and others
- Passionfruit, a website and Daily Dot newsletter
