= Potato virus V =

Virus classification
- (unranked): Virus
- Realm: Riboviria
- Kingdom: Orthornavirae
- Phylum: Pisuviricota
- Class: Stelpaviricetes
- Order: Patatavirales
- Family: Potyviridae
- Genus: Potyvirus
- Species: Potyvirus vetuberosi

Species of virus

Potato virus V (PVV) is a plant virus of the family Potyviridae.
