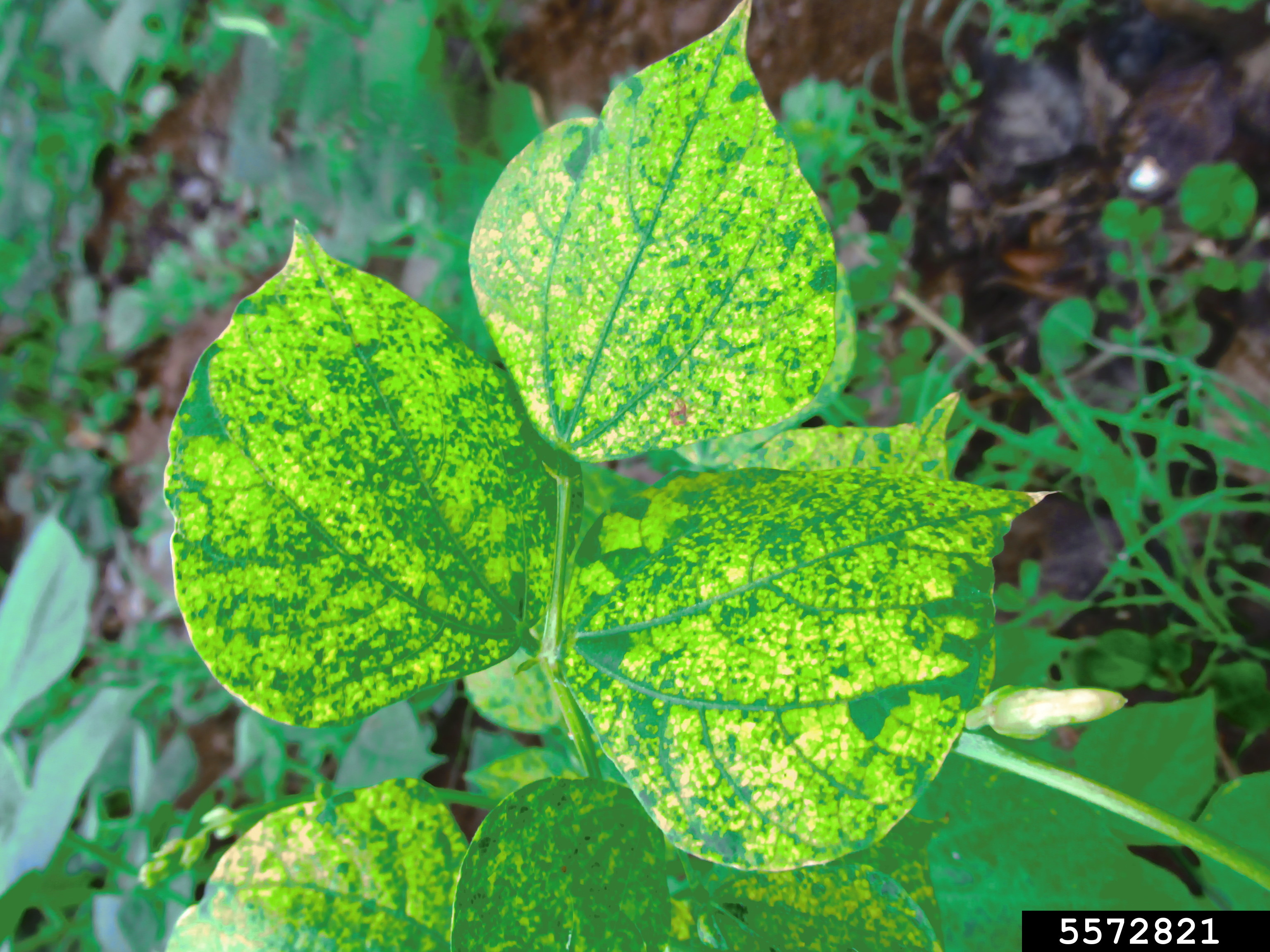
- Plant infected with Bean yellow mosaic virus

Virus classification
- (unranked): Virus
- Realm: Riboviria
- Kingdom: Orthornavirae
- Phylum: Pisuviricota
- Class: Stelpaviricetes
- Order: Patatavirales
- Family: Potyviridae
- Genus: Potyvirus
- Species: Potyvirus phaseoluteum

Synonyms
- Bean virus 2; Canna mosaic virus; Gladiolus mosaic virus

= Bean yellow mosaic virus =

Species of virus

Bean yellow mosaic virus is a pathogenic plant virus in the genus Potyvirus and the virus family Potyviridae. Like other members of the Potyvirus genus, it is a monopartite strand of positive-sense, single-stranded RNA surrounded by a capsid made for a single viral encoded protein. The virus is a filamentous particle that measures about 750 nm in length. This virus is transmitted by species of aphids and by mechanical inoculation.

== Geographic distribution and host range ==
A mosaic disease, believed to be bean yellow mosaic virus, was first reported in the early 1900s infecting garden peas (Pisum sativum) in the Northeastern United States. The virus is currently believed to be distributed worldwide.

In addition to peas, this virus is known to infect many other legumes (family Fabaceae) including green beans (Phaseolus vulgaris), peanuts (Arachis hypogaea), soybeans (Glycine max), Faba beans (Vicia faba), several species of clover (Trifolium hybridum, T. vesiculosum, T. incarnatum, T. pratense, T. repens, T. subterraneum), alfalfa (Medicago sativa), vetch (Vicia sativa), lupine (Lupinus luteus), black locust (Robinia pseudoacacia), fenugreek (Trigonella foenum-graecum), and Crotalaria spectabilis.

It also is known to infect several non-leguminous plants including Gladiolus sp., Fressia sp., opium poppy (Papaver somniferum), Canna spp. and Eustoma russellianum.

Symptoms in these plants include mosaic, leaf malformation and leaf mottling.
