= Carnation vein mottle virus =

Virus classification
- (unranked): Virus
- Realm: Riboviria
- Kingdom: Orthornavirae
- Phylum: Pisuviricota
- Class: Stelpaviricetes
- Order: Patatavirales
- Family: Potyviridae
- Genus: Potyvirus
- Species: Potyvirus dianthi

Species of virus

Carnation vein mottle virus (CVMoV, CVMV) is a plant virus of the family Potyviridae.
