= Passion fruit woodiness virus =

Virus classification
- (unranked): Virus
- Realm: Riboviria
- Kingdom: Orthornavirae
- Phylum: Pisuviricota
- Class: Stelpaviricetes
- Order: Patatavirales
- Family: Potyviridae
- Genus: Potyvirus
- Species: Potyvirus passiflorae

Synonyms
- Passiflora chlorotic spot virus

Species of plant pathogenic virus

Passion fruit woodiness virus (PWV) is a plant virus in the genus Potyvirus and the virus family Potyviridae. Like other members of the genus Potyvirus, PWV is a monopartite strand of positive-sense, single-stranded RNA surrounded by a capsid made for a single viral encoded protein. The virus is a filamentous particle that measures about 745 nm in length.

This virus is transmitted by at least two species of aphids (Myzus persicae and Aphis gossypii) in a non-persistent manner and by mechanical inoculation. There is no evidence that this virus is transmitted in the seed.

Like other potyviruses, this virus produces viral inclusions called cylindrical inclusions. These inclusions can be diagnostic in Passiflora spp. (See #External links)

== Symptoms ==
This virus was named for the symptoms seen in the fruit of infected P. edulis plants. The fruit can be distorted in appearance and the edible part of the fruit becomes thick and hard or “woody”. The virus induces a severe mosaic, with rugosity and chlorotic ringspots in the leaves of P. edulis. Infected plants grow less vigorously and have a shorter life span than those without the virus infection.

Because of its effect on the fruit and plant growth, PWV is considered one of the most economically important of the many viruses that have been found infecting Passiflora spp.

== Geographic distribution and host range ==
PWV was first reported from Australia in 1964 infecting Passiflora edulis

It has since been reported from Central America, Taiwan, South Africa, and Brazil and in at least 10 other Passiflora species including P. suberosa, P. subpeltata, P. aurantia and Passiflora foetida. In 2009 it was found in Florida (USA) in Passiflora choconiana. Since then it has been diagnosed in P. sublanceolata, P.caerulea, and in three hybrids called “Blue Bouquet”, Passiflora x belotii and “Amethyst Star”. (All three hybrids are crosses where one of the parents is Passiflora caerulea.)

A survey for viruses of Passiflora spp. in Florida, published in 1991, found no potyviruses infecting commercial plantings of Passiflora in Florida. This indicates that PWV has been introduced into Florida recently, probably by the importation of infected vegetative cuttings.

Host range inoculations have shown this virus can also infect some cultivars of beans (Phaseolus vulgaris), cowpeas (Vigna unguiculata), and Macroptilium lathyroides. M. latyroides is a native of South America which has been introduced to several other countries including the United States (Florida and Hawaii), India, Australia, and Africa.
