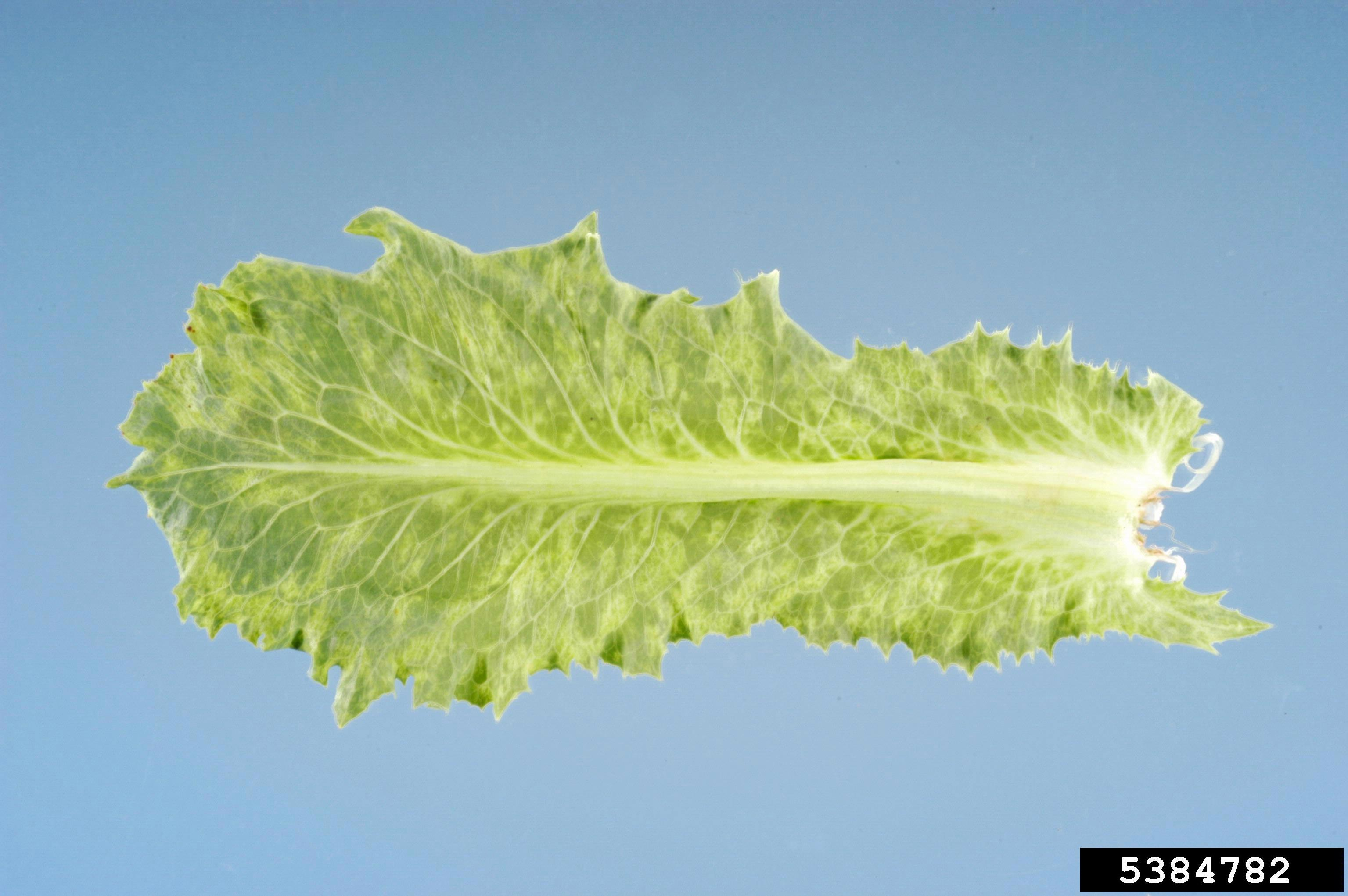
- Symptoms of Bidens mottle virus infection in lettuce (Lactuca sativa)

Virus classification
- (unranked): Virus
- Realm: Riboviria
- Kingdom: Orthornavirae
- Phylum: Pisuviricota
- Class: Stelpaviricetes
- Order: Patatavirales
- Family: Potyviridae
- Genus: Potyvirus
- Species: Potyvirus bidenstessellati

= Bidens mottle virus =

Species of virus

Bidens mottle virus (BiMoV) is a pathogenic plant virus in the plant virus family Potyviridae. BiMoV is a flexuous filamentous particle, 720 nm long, and belongs to the Potyviridae genus Potyvirus. Like other viruses in this genus, Bidens mottle virus is transmitted both mechanically by sap and by aphids in a stylet-borne fashion.

BiMoV was first described in 1968 by Steve Christie, John Edwardson, and Bill Zettler from the Plant Pathology and Agronomy Departments at the University of Florida, Gainesville, Florida. This virus was originally isolated from a mottled plant of the common weed Bidens pilosa collected in Gainesville – hence the name Bidens mottle virus. At the same time it was also found in pepperweed (Lepidium virginicum).

B. pilosa can be doubly infected with BiMoV and a second virus called Sonchus yellow net virus (SYNV). SYNV is asymptomatic in B. pilosa but it enhances the symptoms of BiMoV in this plant when both viruses are present.)

== Host range ==
Since its discovery and first characterization, BiMoV has been found to infect many other host plants. They include the agricultural crops lettuce, escarole, endive, and faba bean (Vicia faba), the forage crop blue lupine (Lupinus angustifolius), and many ornamental and bedding plants. It has also been found in five common weeds including the Mexican pricklepoppy (Argemone mexicana) and the invasive weed, Tropical soda apple (Solanum viarum). In 2008, it was reported to infect bishop's weed (Ammi majus), an umbelliferous plant grown in Florida for the cut flower trade.

== Disease symptoms ==
As with all plant viruses, the symptoms exhibited on an infected plant depend on the plant species. Symptoms of BiMoV in various hosts have been described as mild to severe mottling, slight to severe leaf distortion, vein clearing, and stunting. It can cause flower break symptoms and flower abortion in some hosts and at least one host has been found that shows no visible symptoms.

Symptoms of Bidens mottle virus on Lark Daisy (Centratherum punctatum).

Symptoms of Bidens mottle virus in Faba bean (Vicia faba).

== Disease diagnosis ==
Correct diagnosis of any plant disease requires some expertise. Plants suspected of a viral infection should be sent to a plant disease diagnostic laboratory.

One of the specific tests that a plant diagnostic laboratory might perform is an ELISA or serological test where the plant sap is tested against virus specific antiserum made to the capsid protein of the virus. A PCR test can also be run using the RNA of the virus. A part of the viral genome can be copied and sequenced and then compared to sequences of other potyviruses in the GenBank. If the sequence of the segment matches to a known sequence at 90% or greater it can be assumed the virus in the plant is that same virus.

A third way used to diagnose some plant viruses is to inoculate a variety of other plants and match the known host range for a given plant virus. In addition, plant viruses make inclusion bodies in plant cells that can be stained and seen in a light microscope. Bidens mottle has a distinctive host range and makes typical potyvirus inclusions.

One of the diagnostic hosts for this virus is the plant Zinnia elegans. The virus makes easily recognizable viral inclusions called laminated aggregates and prominent symptoms on both the leaves and the flowers of this plant.)

== Geographic distribution ==
Until 2007 the only place this virus was known was in the United States, in particular in the state of Florida. In 2007, the virus was identified in a new host in Florida and it was partially sequenced for the first time. When the sequence of 247 base pairs was compared to other potyvirus sequences in GenBank it matched a virus found in Taiwan tentatively called Sunflower chlorotic spot virus (SCSV) whose sequence had been deposited in the GenBank in 2001 (GenBank Accession No. AF538686). The nucleotide sequences of the two were 94% identical and the deduced amino acid sequences were 98% identical. At the time it was suggested that SCSV and BiMoV were one and the same.

Another publication in 2008 directly compared the sequences of a second isolate of BiMoV from Florida to the sequence of SCSV from Taiwan. The authors of the article concluded that "the sunflower chlorotic spot virus described from Taiwan is in fact an isolate of BiMoV". In addition, an isolate of what was believed to be SCSV (based on sequences available in 2004) was found in the State of São Paulo in Brazil.

Taken together these reports likely mean that the geographical distribution of BiMoV now includes Taiwan and Brazil in addition to the US. (Note that when two named viruses are found to be identical, precedence is given to the virus name reported first in the literature.)

== Prevention and control ==
Control measures for all plant viruses include prevention and eradication. Bidens mottle virus can be avoided in field crops such as lettuce and endive or in bedding plants such as Ageratum by the removal of weed hosts from areas surrounding the crops and control of aphids. For greenhouse ornamentals propagated by vegetative means, like Fittonia, control requires the removal of infected plants from the propagation stock and the sanitation of tools used in the propagation process.
