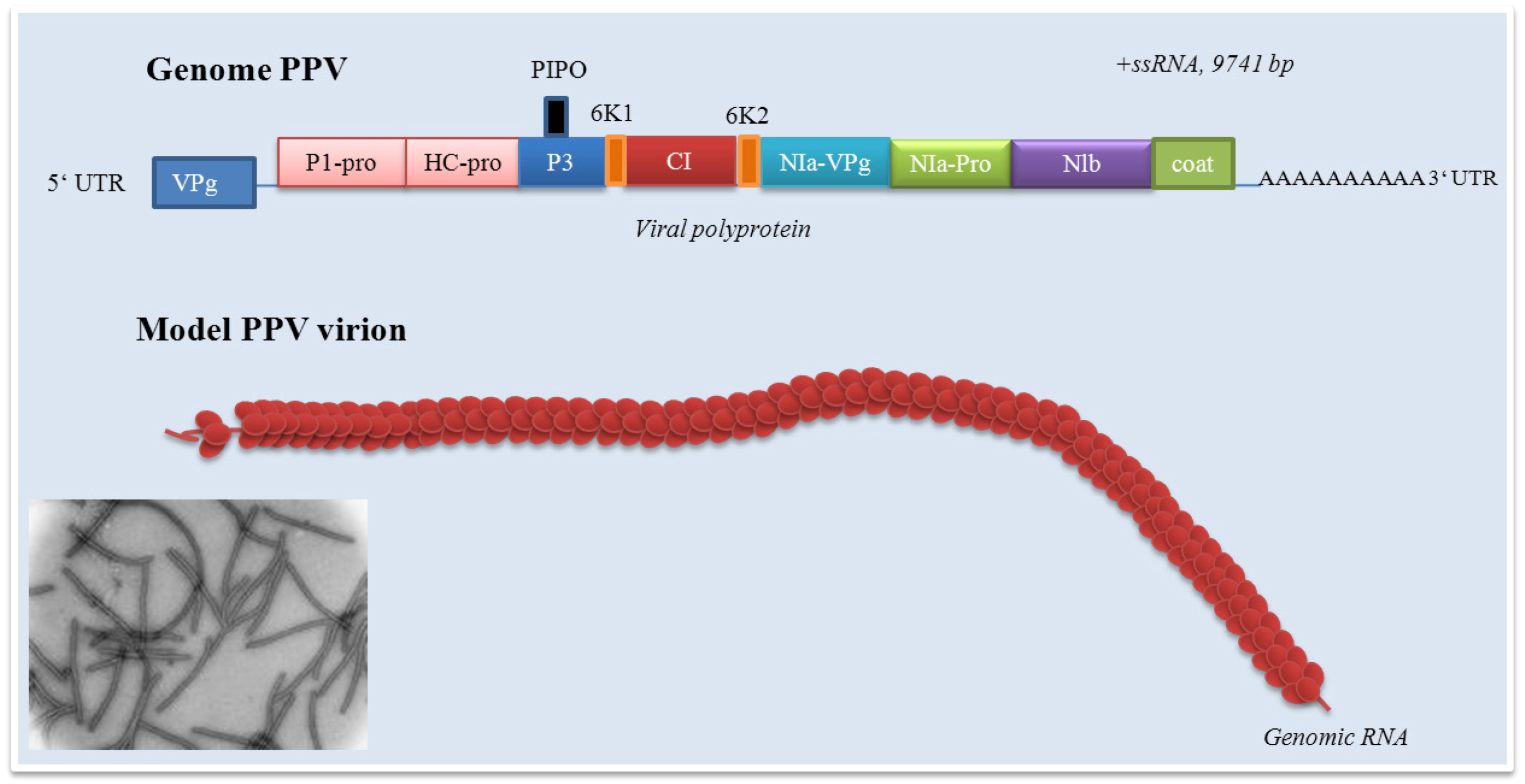
- Plum pox virus genome with electron micrograph and model of virions

Virus classification
- (unranked): Virus
- Realm: Riboviria
- Kingdom: Orthornavirae
- Phylum: Pisuviricota
- Class: Stelpaviricetes
- Order: Patatavirales
- Family: Potyviridae
- Genus: Potyvirus

Species
- See text

= Potyvirus =

Genus of positive-strand RNA viruses in the family Potyviridae

Potyvirus is a genus of positive-strand RNA viruses (named after Potato virus Y (Potyvirus yituberosi, PVY)) in the family Potyviridae. Plants serve as natural hosts. Like begomoviruses, members of this genus may cause significant losses in agricultural, pastoral, horticultural, and ornamental crops. More than 200 species of aphids spread potyviruses, and most are from the subfamily Aphidinae (genera Macrosiphum and Myzus). The genus contains 216 species.

== Structure ==
The virion is non-enveloped with a flexuous and filamentous nucleocapsid, 680 to 900 nanometers (nm) long and is 11–20 nm in diameter. The nucleocapsid contains around 2000 copies of the capsid protein. The symmetry of the nucleocapsid is helical with a pitch of 3.4-3.5 nm.

== Genome ==
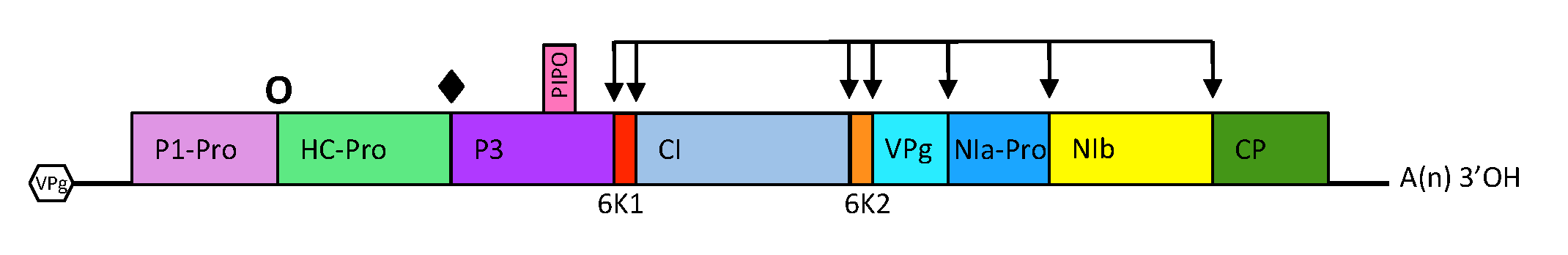
Genomic map of a typical member of the genus Potyvirus.

The genome is a linear, positive-sense, single-stranded RNA ranging in size from 9,000 to 12,000 nucleotide bases. Most potyviruses have non-segmented genomes, though a number of species are bipartite. The typical base compositions of some of the most common, non-recombinant strains of PVY range between ~23.4-23.8 % G; ~31-31.6 % A; ~18.2-18.8 % C; and ~26.5-26.8 % U.

In the species with a monopartite genome, a genome-linked VPg protein is covalently bound to the 5' end and the 3' end is polyadenylated. The genome encodes a single open reading frame (ORF) expressed as a 350 kDa polyprotein precursor. This polyprotein is processed into ten smaller proteins: protein 1 protease (P1-Pro), helper component protease (HC-Pro), protein 3 (P3), cylindrical inclusion (CI), viral protein genome-linked (Vpg), nuclear inclusion A (NIa), nuclear inclusion B (NIb), capsid protein (CP) and two small putative proteins known as 6K1 and 6K2. The P3 cistron also contains an overlapping reading frame called "Pretty interesting Potyviridae ORF" (PIPO). PIPO codes for an alternative C-terminus to the P3 protein, which is generated into a subset of transcripts by a +2 frameshift caused by a ribosome slippage mechanism at a conserved GA_{6} repeat sequence. The resulting protein is called P3N-PIPO. A similar mechanism is thought to produce an alternative reading frame within the P1 cistron, named "pretty interesting sweet potato potyvirus ORF" (PISPO), in a number of sweet potato-infecting potyviruses including sweet potato feathery mottle virus (Potyvirus batataplumei).

== Proteome ==
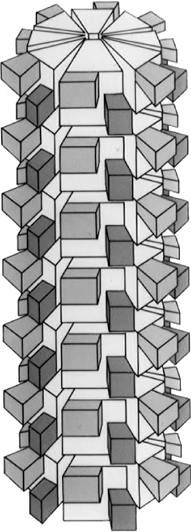
Diagram of potyvirus virion

P1 (~33 kilodaltons (kDa) in molecular weight) is a serine protease which facilitates its own cleavage from the polyprotein at the P1-HC-Pro junction. P1 consists of a conserved C-terminal protease domain and an N-terminal region which has a high level of variation in sequence and length between potyvirus species but exhibits conserved patterns of intrinsic disorder. P1 is also promotes viral RNA replication, though it is not required for it.

HC-Pro (~52 KDa) is a cysteine protease which cleaves a glycine-glycine dipeptide at its own C-terminus. It also interacts with eukaryotic initiation factor 4 (eIF4). It acts as a viral RNA silencing suppressor through its interactions with host AGO proteins. HC-Pro's activity is regulated by the adjacent P1 protein: before P1 cleaves itself off the P1-HC-Pro intermediate, the P1 terminus reduces HC-Pro's RNA silencing suppression activity. The rate of P1 cleavage therefore regulates the level of RNA interference suppression during infection. HC-Pro is also involved in aphid transmission. Though the exact mechanism is unknown, HC-Pro has been proposed to attach to host aphid mouth parts through its N-terminal zinc finger-like domain and anchor virions through its interactions with the capsid protein.

P3 (~41 kDa) is a membrane protein which is required for viral replication and accumulates in viral replication vesicles. It mediates the interactions between replication vesicles and movement complex proteins which may allow replication vesicles to be recruited to the movement complex for efficient intercellular movement. P3 also interacts with large subunit of the ribulose-1,5-bisphosphate carboxylase/oxygenase.

CI (~71 kDa) is an RNA helicase with ATPase activity. Its most unusual property is its ability to form large and highly symmetrical conical and cylindrical inclusions with a central hollow cylinder from which laminate sheets radiate outward and fold in on themselves in a pattern often described as "pinwheels". These inclusions are easily seen in transmission electron micrographs of infected tissues and were historically used as a diagnostic criterion for potyvirus infections. CI inclusions are a major component of the potyviral movement complex which is assembled at plasmodesmata. CI is also required for viral replication and is present on replication membranes. Its exact contributions to replication are not clear but, as an RNA helicase, CI is likely facilitating replication by dismantling the secondary structures of viral RNA.

NIa (~50 kDa) forms crystalline inclusions in the host nucleus. It is cleaved into NIa-Pro and VPg.

NIa-Pro (~27 kDa) is a cysteine protease which processes most of the cleavage sites of the polyprotein. The only exceptions are the self-cleavages of P1 and HC-Pro. The high degree of cleavage sequence specificity and conservation has made NIa-Pro (often that of Tobacco etch virus) a valuable tool in biotechnology, especially in applications which require removing affinity tags from recombinant proteins after affinity purification. NIa-Pro has also shown to exhibit sequence-independent DNase activity and to interfere with host DNA methylation suggesting that NIa and/or NIa-Pro are altering in host gene expression. Potyviral NIa-Pro shares a high level of homology with the picornaviral 3C protease.

VPg (~22 kDa) is covalently attached to the 5' end of the viral genomic RNA through uridylation and is thought to act as a primer for viral genome replication similarly to the VPg proteins of picornaviridae. It is a highly disordered protein and its flexibility has been suggested to allow it to interact with many other viral proteins. VPg also interacts with various host proteins including eukaryotic initiation factor 4E (eIF4E), eukaryotic elongation factor 1A (eEF1A), and poly(A)-binding protein (PABP).

NIb (~59 kDa) is a superfamily II RNA-dependent RNA polymerase (RdRp) which polymerises viral RNA during replication. Like NIa, NIb forms inclusions in the host nucleus where it is transported due to its two nuclear localisation sequences. NIb has the three-domain "palm, thumb, and fingers" structure typical of RdRps.

6K1 (~6 kDa) the function is not known, but because it accumulates in replication vesicles and has a transmembrane domain, 6K1 is thought to contribute to virus-induced vesicle formation.

6K2 (~6 kDa) is a transmembrane protein which rearranges host membranes into virus-induced membrane structures. It interacts with various ER exit site proteins to produce vesicular and tubular extensions which eventually mature into replication vesicles. 6K2 has three main domains: the N-terminal domain which is required for cell-to-cell movement, the central hydrophobic transmembrane alpha helix, and the C terminal domain which is required for viral replication.

P3N-PIPO (~25 kDa) is a dedicated movement protein which anchors the movement complex to the plasmodesma. It may also modulate the plasmodesmatal size exclusion limit by interacting with host proteins which sever plasmodesmatal actin filaments and reduce callose deposition. It interacts with both the large and small subunits of the ribulose-1,5-bisphosphate carboxylase/oxygenase.

CP (~30 - 35 kDa) is the capsid protein. It has two terminal domains which are disordered and exposed at the surface of the virion. The central core domain contains an RNA-binding pocket which binds to viral RNA. The structure of the capsid protein is highly conserved in potyviruses, though there is a relatively high degree of sequence variability. In addition to encapsidating the virion, CP core domain is required for intercellular movement and contributes to seed transmission.

Certain atypical potyviruses code for additional proteins or protein domains, such as P1-PISPO, Alkylation B (AlkB), and inosine triphosphate pyrophosphatase (known as ITPase or HAM1). Such anomalies are often situated in the hypervariable P1-HC-Pro region.

== Life cycle ==
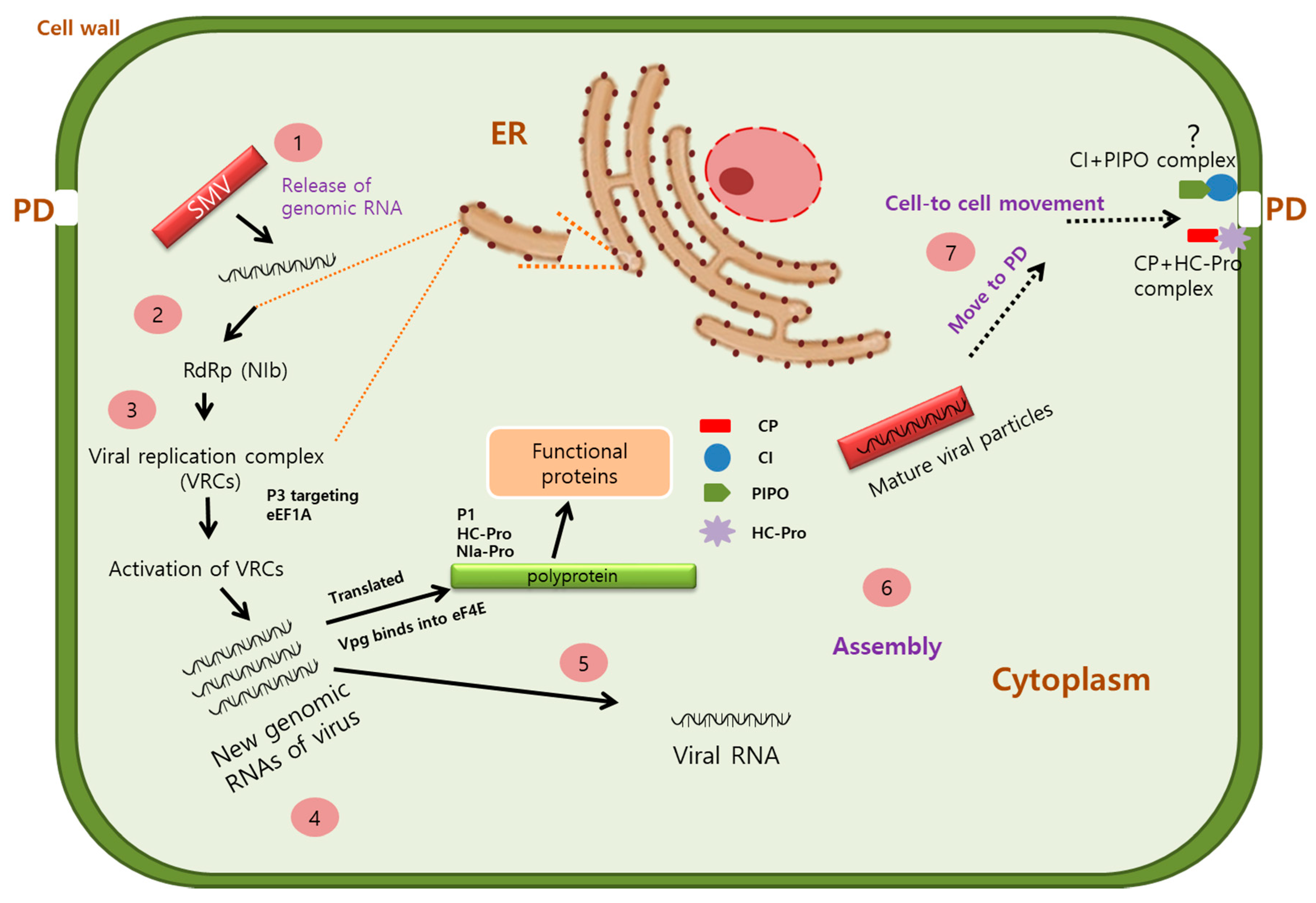
Replication and movement of soybean mosaic virus (SMV) within cell

=== Transmission ===
Most potyviruses are transmitted by aphids as they probe plant tissues with their stylet during feeding. They do not circulate or multiply within the aphid and typically only persist in the aphid for a few minutes. Certain potyviruses have been shown to alter the feeding patterns of their aphid vectors, which may manifest as longer periods of time spent on infected plants, reduced non-probing feeding time, and increased phloem sap ingestion.

Seed and pollen transmission has been documented in certain potyvirus species, for instance in PVY and Turnip mosaic virus (Potyvirus rapae, TUMV). Vegetative transmission by infected tubers or grafting material are of particular concern for certain agricultural crops, such as potato and fruit trees, respectively.

Transmission can also occur by physical contact with infected plants or with contaminated tools, clothes, or even water.

=== Translation ===
After entry, potyvirus particles are uncoated and genomic RNA is released into host cytoplasm. Potyviral RNA mimicks host mRNA: the 5' VPg protein shares functional similarities with the 5' cap and the 3' end is polyadenylated. VPg and its interactions with eIF4E and eIF4(iso)E allow the virus to utilise host cap-dependent translation machinery for its translation. Similarly to eukaryotic translation, the VPg-eIF4E interaction assembles the eIF4F complex around viral RNA.

A number of weak internal ribosome entry sites (IRES) have been identified in many potyvirus species but it is not known whether cap-independent translation is an important translation mechanism for potyviruses.

=== Replication ===
Like many other positive strand RNA viruses, potyvirus replication is heavily associated with host membranes. The viral 6K2 protein coordinates the rearrangement of host membranes into various infection-associated structures which, depending on the potyvirus species, can include anything from small round viral vesicles to complex globular structures with many cisternae or lobes. These structures are dotted with viral replication complexes and are often called "replication vesicles", "viroplasm" or "viral factories". Replication vesicle membranes are derived from a variety of host organelles and the sources differ between potyvirus species. Some membrane sources include the ER, chloroplasts, Golgi apparatus, and vacuoles.

The exact replication mechanism is not known but it involves a negative sense RNA intermediate and requires both viral and host proteins. Viral proteins detected in replication complexes include HC-Pro, P3, 6K1, 6K2, CI, VPg, NIa-Pro, and NIb. Host factors present in replication vesicles include eIF4A and several heat shock proteins.

=== Intercellular movement ===
Like most plant viruses, potyviruses have evolved to move from one plant cell to another through plasmodesmata. However, unlike some well-studied plant viruses, such as the Tobacco mosaic virus, potyviruses do not have a single movement protein but instead assemble a movement complex around the plasmodesma. This complex is primarily composed of three viral proteins: CI, CP, P3N-PIPO. Conical CI inclusions are anchored to plasmodesmata by P3N-PIPO during the early stages of potyvirus infection. This allows the inclusion to funnel either viral particles or viral RNA-CP complexes through the plasmodesma. Replication vesicles are also recruited to the movement complex, suggesting that replication and movement are coupled. Replication vesicles are recruited by P3N-PIPO, which interacts with both CI and P3 through the shared P3N-domain. P3's interaction with 6K2 allows replication vesicles to be tethered to the movement complex.

== Evolution ==
Potyviruses evolved between 6,600 and 7,250 years ago. They appear to have evolved in southwest Eurasia or north Africa. The estimated mutation rate is about 1.15×10^{−4} nucleotide substitutions/site/year.

== Geographical distribution ==
Agriculture was introduced into Australia in the 18th century. This introduction also included plant pathogens. Thirty eight potyvirus species have been isolated in Australia. Eighteen potyviruses have been found only in Australia and are presumed to be endemic there. The remaining twenty appear to have been introduced with agriculture.

== Diagnostics ==
Historically, potyvirus diagnostics relied on the detection of various proteinaceous inclusions in infected plant cells. These may appear as crystals in either the cytoplasm or in the nucleus, as amorphous X-bodies, membranous bodies, viroplasms or pinwheels. The inclusions may or may not (depending on the species) contain virions. These inclusions can be seen by light microscopy in leaf strips of infected plant tissue stained with Orange-Green (protein stain) but not Azure A (nucleic acid stain).

Modern detection methods rely primarily on reverse transcription PCR.

== Taxonomy ==
Potyvirus contains the following species, listed by abbreviated scientific name and followed by the exemplar virus of the species:

- P. achyranthis Achyranthes virus A
- P. aconiti Aconitum virus 2
- P. adiuris Donkey orchid virus A
- P. algeriaense Algerian watermelon mosaic virus
- P. alilii Lily virus A
- P. alliumagrestis Wild onion symptomless virus
- P. almeidi Alternanthera mild mosaic virus
- P. alstromeriae Alstroemeria mosaic virus
- P. amaranthi Amaranthus leaf mottle virus
- P. ampeloprasi Leek yellow stripe virus
- P. anemones Anemone mosaic virus
- P. angelicae Angelica virus Y
- P. apii Apium virus Y
- P. apiumtessellati Celery mosaic virus
- P. arachidis Peanut mottle virus
- P. araujiae Araujia mosaic virus
- P. arracachae Arracacha mottle virus
- P. artichokis Chinese artichoke mosaic virus
- P. ascaloniae Shallot yellow stripe virus
- P. ascaloniavirgae Scallion mosaic virus
- P. ashitabae Ashitaba mosaic virus
- P. asparagi Asparagus virus 1
- P. atuberosi Potato virus A
- P. barbacenense Barbacena virus Y
- P. basellae Basella rugose mosaic virus
- P. batatalatentis Sweet potato latent virus
- P. batatamaculae Sweet potato mild speckling virus
- P. batataplumei Sweet potato feathery mottle virus
- P. begoniae Begonia flower breaking virus
- P. betaceum Beet mosaic virus
- P. betaci Tamarillo leaf malformation virus
- P. bidensia Bidens mosaic virus
- P. bidenstessellati Bidens mottle virus
- P. brugmansiae Brugmansia mosaic virus
- P. calistephi Callistephus mottle virus
- P. callanthis Calanthe mild mosaic virus
- P. cannae Canna yellow streak virus
- P. capsianuli Chilli ringspot virus
- P. capsiflavi Pepper yellow mosaic virus
- P. capsimaculae Pepper mottle virus
- P. capsiseverum Pepper severe mosaic virus
- P. capsivenae Pepper veinal mottle virus
- P. capsivenamaculae Chilli veinal mottle virus
- P. caricae Papaya leaf distortion mosaic virus
- P. carotae Carrot virus Y
- P. carotatenuifoli Carrot thin leaf virus
- P. caryae Pecan mosaic-associated virus
- P. catharantessellati Catharanthus mosaic virus
- P. catharanthiflavitessellati Periwinkle mild yellow mosaic virus
- P. cebatatae Sweet potato virus C
- P. cepae Onion yellow dwarf virus
- P. ceratobii Ceratobium mosaic virus
- P. chamaescillae Blue squill virus A
- P. chichorii Endive necrotic mosaic virus
- P. citrulli Watermelon mosaic virus
- P. citrullimoroccense Moroccan watermelon mosaic virus
- P. citrullufolimaculae Watermelon leaf mottle virus
- P. clitoriae Clitoria virus Y
- P. cliviaflavilineae Clivia yellow stripe virus
- P. colchici Meadow saffron breaking virus
- P. commelinae Commelina mosaic virus
- P. cordophani Sudan watermelon mosaic virus
- P. costus Costus stripe mosaic virus
- P. croci Saffron latent virus
- P. crocitessellati Saffron yellow mosaic virus
- P. cucurbitae Cucurbit vein banding virus
- P. cucurbitaflavitesselati Zucchini yellow mosaic virus
- P. cynanchi Keunjorong mosaic virus
- P. cypripedii Cypripedium virus Y
- P. cyrtanthi Cyrtanthus elatus virus A
- P. dactylis Cocksfoot streak virus
- P. daphnis Daphne mosaic virus
- P. dasheenis Dasheen mosaic virus
- P. daturae Datura shoestring virus
- P. dendrobii Dendrobium chlorotic mosaic virus
- P. dianthi Carnation vein mottle virus
- P. dioscoreae Dioscorea mosaic virus
- P. duobatatae Sweet potato virus 2
- P. esculentinecrosis Tomato necrotic stunt virus
- P. eucharae Amazon lily mosaic virus
- P. euphorbiae Euphorbia ringspot virus
- P. fountaingrassi Pennisetum alopecuroides mosaic virus
- P. freesiae Freesia mosaic virus
- P. fritillariae Fritillary virus Y
- P. galanthi Snowdrop virus Y
- P. gebatatae Sweet potato virus G
- P. gladioli Gladiolus mosaic virus
- P. gloriosae Gloriosa stripe mosaic virus
- P. glycitessellati Soybean mosaic virus
- P. gomphocarphi Gomphocarpus mosaic virus
- P. habenariae Habenaria mosaic virus
- P. halapensis Johnsongrass mosaic virus
- P. hardenbergiae Hardenbergia mosaic virus
- P. heliannulabis Sunflower ring blotch virus
- P. helichloromaculae Sunflower chlorotic mottle virus
- P. helitenuitessellati Sunflower mild mosaic virus
- P. helitessellati Sunflower mosaic virus
- P. henbanis Henbane mosaic virus
- P. heraclei Hogweed virus Y
- P. hibbertiae Hibbertia virus Y
- P. hiemalisdaphnis Daphne virus Y
- P. hippeastri Hippeastrum mosaic virus
- P. hyacinthi Hyacinth mosaic virus
- P. impatiensis Impatiens flower break virus
- P. iris Iris fulva mosaic virus
- P. iriseverum Iris severe mosaic virus
- P. iristenuis Iris mild mosaic virus
- P. jasmini Jasmine virus T
- P. kalanchoes Kalanchoë mosaic virus
- P. konjac Konjac mosaic virus
- P. lactucae Lettuce mosaic virus
- P. lactucaitalicense Lettuce Italian necrotic virus
- P. lilimaculae Lily mottle virus
- P. lupinus Lupine mosaic virus
- P. lycorsis Lycoris mild mottle virus
- P. malvae Malva vein clearing virus
- P. melongenae African eggplant mosaic virus
- P. melozonati Wild melon banding virus
- P. mirabilis Mirabilis crinkle mosaic virus
- P. miscanthi Miscanthus sinensis mosaic virus
- P. morindatessellati Noni mosaic virus
- P. muricati Wild potato mosaic virus
- P. musae Banana bract mosaic virus
- P. narcissus Narcissus yellow stripe virus
- P. narcissusdegeneris Narcissus degeneration virus
- P. narcissuslineae Narcissus late season yellows virus
- P. nerinis Nerine yellow stripe virus
- P. nicotianainsculpentis Tobacco etch virus
- P. nicotianamaculae Tobacco mosqueado virus
- P. nicotianavenamaculae Tobacco vein mottling virus
- P. nicotianavenaobscurum Tobacco vein banding mosaic virus
- P. nippodioscoreae Japanese yam mosaic virus
- P. nothoscordi Nothoscordum mosaic virus
- P. orionspassiflorae East Asian Passiflora virus
- P. ornithogali Ornithogalum virus 2
- P. ornithogalitessellati Ornithogalum stripe mosaic virus
- P. pachyrhizus Yambean mosaic virus
- P. panax Panax virus Y
- P. papayanuli Papaya ringspot virus
- P. paris Paris virus 1
- P. parisflavitessellati Paris yunnanensis mosaic chlorotic virus
- P. parisnecrosis Paris mosaic necrosis virus
- P. passifloradistorti East Asian Passiflora distortion virus
- P. passiflorae Passion fruit woodiness virus
- P. passifloraflavi Passiflora chlorosis virus
- P. passiflorafricanse Ugandan Passiflora virus
- P. passifloramaculae Passionfruit Vietnam virus
- P. passiflory Passiflora virus Y
- P. pastinacae Parsnip mosaic virus
- P. pennisseti Pennisetum mosaic virus
- P. pepo Zucchini yellow fleck virus
- P. peporesticulae Zucchini shoestring virus
- P. pepotigris Zucchini tigre mosaic virus
- P. perulycopersici Peru tomato mosaic virus
- P. pfaffiae Pfaffia mosaic virus
- P. phaseoli Bean common mosaic necrosis virus
- P. phaseoluteum Bean yellow mosaic virus
- P. phaseovulgaris Bean common mosaic virus
- P. phytolaccae Pokeweed mosaic virus
- P. pisumsemenportati Pea seed-borne mosaic virus
- P. platycodonis Platycodon mild mottle virus
- P. pleioblasti Pleioblastus mosaic virus
- P. pleionis Pleione flower breaking virus
- P. plumpoxi Plum pox virus
- P. polianthis Tuberose mild mosaic virus
- P. polianthismaculae Tuberose mild mottle virus
- P. polygonati Polygonatum mosaic-associated virus 1
- P. polygonatimaculae Polygonatum kingianum mottle virus
- P. puerariae Kudzu chlorotic ring blotch virus
- P. ranunculi Ranunculus mosaic virus
- P. ranunculideformationis Ranunculus leaf distortion virus
- P. ranunculitenuis Ranunculus mild mosaic virus
- P. rapae Turnip mosaic virus
- P. rhopalanthi Rhopalanthe virus Y
- P. rutae Mediterranean ruda virus
- P. sacchari Sugarcane mosaic virus
- P. sarcochili Sarcochilus virus Y
- P. schizanthi Butterfly flower mosaic virus
- P. scorzaureum Scorzonera virus A
- P. shilinense Paris potyvirus 5
- P. sorghitessellati Sorghum mosaic virus
- P. spiranthesis Spiranthes mosaic virus 3
- P. streptopi Twisted-stalk chlorotic streak virus
- P. suaveolens Brugmansia suaveolens mottle virus
- P. tagetis Marigold mosaic virus
- P. telfairiae Telfairia mosaic virus
- P. telosmae Telosma mosaic virus
- P. tetraparis Paris potyvirus 4
- P. thevetiae Thevetia white spot virus
- P. thladiatessellati Thladiantha dubia mosaic virus
- P. thurnbergii Thunberg fritillary mosaic virus
- P. torvi Wild tomato mosaic virus
- P. tradescantiae Tradescantia mild mosaic virus
- P. trifolii Clover yellow vein virus
- P. trompetae Colombian datura virus
- P. tropaeoli Mashua virus Y
- P. tuberosiflavi Potato yellow blotch virus
- P. tulipadefractum Tulip breaking virus
- P. tulipatessellati Tulip mosaic virus
- P. vallotae Vallota mosaic virus
- P. vanillae Vanilla distortion mosaic virus
- P. verbenae Verbena virus Y
- P. vetuberosi Potato virus V
- P. vignae Cowpea aphid-borne mosaic virus
- P. wisteriae Wisteria vein mosaic virus
- P. yamplacidum Yam mild mosaic virus
- P. yamtesselati Yam mosaic virus
- P. yidiuris Diuris virus Y
- P. yililii Lily yellow mosaic virus
- P. yiornithogali Ornithogalum virus 3
- P. yipleionis Pleione virus Y
- P. yituberosi Potato virus Y
- P. zantedeschiae Calla lily latent virus
- P. zantedeschiatenuis Zantedeschia mild mosaic virus
- P. zeananus Maize dwarf mosaic virus
- P. zeatessellati Zea mosaic virus; Iranian johnsongrass mosaic virus

A further four viruses were previously classified as species in this genus but were abolished due to lack of genetic sequence information:

- Cowpea green vein banding virus
- Groundnut eyespot virus
- Helenium virus Y
- Tropaeolum mosaic virus

=== Species groups ===
Potyviruses were further divided into the PVY, SCMV, BYMV, BCMV species groups in 1992. Gibbs and Ohshima 2010 produced a more extensive molecular phylogeny with the same four, but also several new groups: the BtMV, ChVMV, DaMV, OYDV, PRSV, TEV, and TuMV.

==== PVY ====
Contains 16 species including Potato virus Y. The primary hosts are: Nine Solanaceae, three Amaranthus, three Asteraceae, one Lilium, and one Amaryllis.

== Bibliography ==
- Ward CW, Shukla DD (1991). "Taxonomy of potyviruses: current problems and some solutions". Intervirology. 32 (5): 269–296. doi:10.1159/000150211. PMID 1657820.
- King AM, et al., eds. (2012). "Potyvirus". Virus taxonomy : classification and nomenclature of viruses : ninth report of the International Committee on Taxonomy of Viruses. London: Academic Press. pp. 926–1072. ISBN 978-0123846846.
