= Pepper mottle virus =

Virus classification
- (unranked): Virus
- Realm: Riboviria
- Kingdom: Orthornavirae
- Phylum: Pisuviricota
- Class: Stelpaviricetes
- Order: Patatavirales
- Family: Potyviridae
- Genus: Potyvirus
- Species: Potyvirus capsimaculae

Synonyms
- Chilli mottle virus; Arizona pepper virus

Species of virus

Pepper mottle virus (PepMoV) is a plant virus in the genus Potyvirus and the virus family Potyviridae. Like other members of the Potyvirus genus, PepMV is a monopartite strand of positive-sense, single-stranded RNA surrounded by a capsid made for a single viral encoded protein. The virus is a filamentous particle that measures about 737 nm in length. Isolates of this virus has been completely sequenced and its RNA is 9640 nucleotides long. This virus is transmitted by several species of aphids in a nonpersitant manner and by mechanical inoculation.

== Geographic Distribution and Host Range ==
Pepper mottle was first recognized as a new strain of PVY infecting peppers in Arizona in 1969. In the early 1970s an "atypical" PVY isolate was also found in a survey of pepper fields in central Florida. Up until then, the two most important potyviruses infecting peppers in the US were Tobacco etch virus (TEV) and Potato virus Y (PVY). By 1975 it was clear that a third potyvirus, PepMoV (PeMV), was contributing to crop losses in pepper growing areas of the United States. It has also been found in California, New Mexico, Texas, and in Central America (El Salvador) (3). In 2003, it was reported in C. annuum in Japan.

This virus infects many species of Solanaceae, including several species of Capsicum (i.e. C. annuum, C. frutescens), Datura spp., Lycopersicon esculentum, Physalis floriana, tobacco (Nicotiana spp.) and nightshade (Solanum sp.) (2,4). It was its reaction on C. frutescens (Tabasco pepper) that alerted researchers to the presence of a new virus in peppers.

== Symptoms and Diagnosis ==
Symptoms of PepMoV on pepper include dark green vein banding, mottle/mosaic, puckered or crinkled leaves, and misshapen fruit. Plants infected early in the growing season can be stunted and the virus can decrease yield significantly. (See pictures of symptoms)

Surveys have shown that PepMoV can often occur in mixed infections with TEV and/or PVY so a technique such as ELISA must be used to differentiate these three virus in pepper. Antiserum is available for all three potyviruses, as are primers for PCR tests and sequencing.

PepMoV makes two types of inclusions in infected cells, the typical cylindrical inclusions (CI) and an amorphous inclusion (AI). Thus leaf strips stained with the protein stain, OG, and the nucleic acid stain, AA, can be used to identify this virus in pepper. The CI only stains in OG while the AI stains in both stains.

Symptoms and Inclusions of PepMoV in Capsicum annuum
