= Sweet potato feathery mottle virus =

Virus classification
- (unranked): Virus
- Realm: Riboviria
- Kingdom: Orthornavirae
- Phylum: Pisuviricota
- Class: Stelpaviricetes
- Order: Patatavirales
- Family: Potyviridae
- Genus: Potyvirus
- Species: Potyvirus batataplumei

Synonyms
- Sweet potato chlorotic leaf spot virus; Sweet potato internal cork virus; Sweet potato russet crack virus; Sweet potato virus A

Species of virus

Sweet potato feathery mottle virus (SPFMV) is a member of the genus Potyvirus in the family Potyviridae. It is most widely recognized as one of the most regularly occurring causal agents of sweet potato viral disease (SPVD) and is currently observed in every continent except Antarctica. The number of locations where it is found is still increasing; generally, it is assumed that the virus is present wherever its host is. The virus has four strains that are found in varying parts of the world.

== History ==
SPFMV was initially discovered in the United States 70 years ago, and currently, it is the most widely spread sweet potato virus in the world. The presence of this virus is usually indicated by the presence of sweet potato viral disease, as it is noticed less often on its own. SPFMV was more recently discovered in Italy as the primary contributor to Italian SPVD.

== Structure ==
All potyviruses are non-enveloped viruses with positive sense single-stranded RNA genomes. The SPFMV genome is approximately 10,820 bases long, varying slightly depending upon the specific strain. The majority of the SPFMV genome is one open reading frame, followed by a 3’ UTR and a poly(A) tail. The 3’ UTR exhibits secondary structure that may be involved in recognizing viral replicase. All potyviruses have 3’ poly(A) sequences, although they lack the cellular signal sequence for poly(A) tail addition. The encoded genes are P1, HC-Pro (helper component proteinase), P3, 6K1, CI, 6K2, NIa, NIb, and the coat protein cistron, which is found in a variety of other viruses. During replication, the entire genome is translated as a polyprotein and cleaved. The gene for cistron is located near the 3’ terminal end.

Protein	Protein function
P1	Proteinase, ssRNA binding activity
HC-Pro	Proteinase, aids in transmission by aphid, long-distance movement
P3	Viral replication function
6K1	Unknown
CI	Cytoplasmic inclusion protein, RNA helicase activity
6K2	Unknown (involved in viral replication)
NIa	VPg (viral genome linked protein) and proteinase
NIb	Viral replicase
Cistron	Coat protein, assembly of virion, control of viral transmission, virus spread

TABLE 1: SPFMV Viral proteins and functions.

Overall, the genome is 10-15% longer than average potyvirus genome lengths; fittingly, cistron also is uniquely large in this virus. The virion is a long, flexuous, rod-shaped unit, and ranges from 810 to 865 nanometers in length.

== Life cycle ==
The specifics of the SPFMV replication cycle are not known in full. After entry, helper component proteinase (HcPro) binds eIF4E, a eukaryotic cap-binding translation initiation factor that plays a crucial role for potyvirus replication. VPg and NIa also interact with translation initiation factors to instigate the translation process. The genome is then translated into a polyprotein, which is then cleaved at specific cleavage sequences by three proteases, HC-Pro, and P1 and NIa-Pro, which are also encoded in the viral genome. HcPro also suppresses gene silencing via siRNA and miRNA in the host, which contributes to cytopathic effects in the plant. If the host possesses eIF4E, HcPro will interact with this factor to alter transcription of the host cell. Once the viral proteins are translated, the genome is replicated (as mediated by 6K2, P3, and CI) and packaged into the virion.

== Transmission and infection ==
Due to the presence of a cell wall, virus entry into plant cells is limited to mechanical transmission or transmission by a vector that can pierce or damage a plant and create a site of entry for the virus. SPFMV is transmitted non-persistently on the stylet tips of aphids as they bite the sweet potato plant. Species of sweet potato affected by SPFMV are diverse, and include many Ipomoea spp. (I. alba, I. aquatica, I. heredifolia, I. nil, I. lacunose, I. purpurea, I. cordatotriloba, I. tricolor), three Nicotiana spp. (N. benthamiana, N. rustica, N. tabacum), Chenopodium quinoa, and Datura stramonium. The virus has been shown to primarily infect vegetative tissue and not reproductive tissue, so it is not transmitted from parent plants through their seeds.

== Symptoms, diagnosis, and treatments ==
The effects of SPFMV are dependent upon species of sweet potato as well as strain of virus, and can vary between geographical locations. Many infections are localized, mild, and often asymptomatic, and can go untreated without causing significant damage to the plant. The most common symptom of SPFMV is a feathery, purple pattern in the leaves. However, more virulent strains such as the russet crack strain (RC) have been known to cause root necrosis and leaf chlorosis, and some strains have been shown to cause root discoloration. However, due to SPFMV's significant contribution to sweet potato viral disease, many studies are directed toward creating immunity to SPFMV in susceptible plants. One such method is the creation of transgene plants using proteins such as cysteine proteinase inhibitors, which would inhibit viral polyprotein cleavage.

== Genetic variability ==
The disease's widespread dominance is conducive to high levels of variance between isolates, as many are separated by significant geographical distance and develop unique mutations. Variance between strains is due to sequence differentiation in the coat protein gene, occasionally leading to a different immune response. Therefore, detection of different strains is performed via genome sequencing or serology, which is made possible by inoculating rabbits with the virus. There are four strains currently known: EA, found only in East Africa; RC, found in Australia, Africa, North America, and Asia; O, from Africa, Asia, and South America; and C, from Australia, Africa, Asia, North America, and South America.

== Sweet potato viral disease ==
=== Coinfection/Synergism ===
While SPFMV can act alone to inflict disease on sweet potato plants, its reputation is more closely tied to sweet potato viral disease (SPVD), which is caused by simultaneous infection of SPFMV with sweet potato chlorotic stunt virus (SPCSV), which is transmitted by whiteflies. It is speculated that HC-Pro activity, which is involved in the long-distance movement of SPFMV, is one of the primary mechanisms by which all these viruses are propagated throughout the plant. Since SPFMV is not as lethal as some, its ability to travel long distances is more damaging when packaged with more virulent viral genomes. Synergistic infections involve a virus and a co-infecting virus infecting an organism together, with one virus assisting the other by increasing its capacity to spread or increasing its replicative abilities. Note that not every simultaneous infection can lead to a co-infection, but, only when specific concentrations of each virus are reached.

Since most plant viruses exhibit mild, localized effects and generally go either undetected or untreated, the symptoms involved in co-infections such as SPVD are a unique threat. SPFMV is one such mildly impactful virus that is enhanced by synergism. Titers of SPFMV can be up to 600 times larger than that of a normal infection, while SPCSV titers stay relatively similar. Several other potyviruses influence synergistic diseases, but very few show such dramatic changes. One such example is sweet potato mild mottle virus (SPMMV), which also co-infects with SPCSV, but with less significant results.

=== Symptoms and agricultural impact ===
SPVD spreads rapidly and has a host of symptoms, but usually manifests itself in stunted plant growth and leaves exhibiting pale coloration, mosaic patterns, abnormal smallness or narrowness, distortion or crinkling. Yield of these plants is reduced significantly; anywhere from half its original yield to almost no yield at all is seen. Because not all of the SPVD-associated viruses are present in certain parts of the world, the effects of co-infection in sweet potatoes vary. In Oceana, for example, co-infections involving SPFMV have been observed to be less virulent, while those in Southern Africa display more damage and significant yield loss in crops. In Barbados SPFMV co-infection may be due to its interaction with DNA viruses also leading to severe yield losses.

In many of the areas where SPVD is a serious concern, sweet potato is an inexpensive staple of the indigenous diet. The virus especially impacts impoverished families and those living far from cities, demographics that rely more heavily on the sweet potato for food. The spread of the virus is exacerbated by agricultural practices such as “cutting and propagating,” which cuts off vines of already existing plants and uses them to establish more; if the original plant already has the disease, each subsequent cutting will as well. Improperly cleaned tools also increase the transmission of the virus. If an infected plant was recently cut into, virus can remain on the instrument and use the damage done to the cell wall by cutting into the plant to infect them.

=== Treatment and management of SPVD ===
Early detection and prevention is the most effective strategy by which this disease is managed. The presence of the offending viruses can be detected and confirmed by enzyme-linked immunosorbent assay (ELISA). When confirmed, diseased plants must be removed from areas where others are growing. Because the viruses that contribute to SPVD vary depending on the geographical location of the infection, there is no universal treatment for the disease. However, as SPFMV is the most widely spread offender, it is a well-researched target for plant immunity. Genetic modification is one of the predominant methods by which sweet potato plants are protected against contraction of SPVD. Plant cells that undergo transfection with plasmids containing antiviral genes have been observed to successfully develop transgenic plants.
