= Primula mottle virus =

Primula mottle virus (PrMoV)

Virus classification
- Group: Group IV ((+)ssRNA)
- Family: Potyviridae
- Genus: Potyvirus
- Species: Primula mottle virus

Species of virus

Primula mottle virus (PrMoV) is a plant pathogenic virus of the family Potyviridae.
