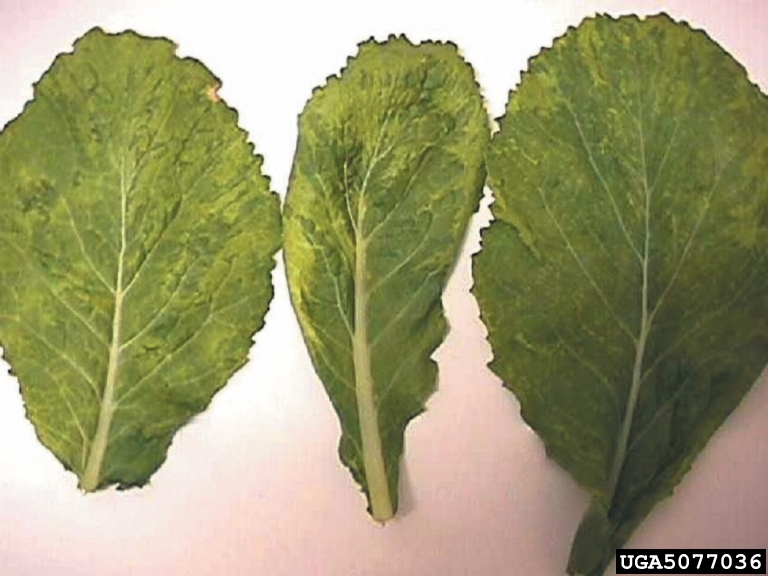
- Leaves showing interveinal chlorosis, puckering and distortion.

Virus classification
- (unranked): Virus
- Realm: Riboviria
- Kingdom: Orthornavirae
- Phylum: Pisuviricota
- Class: Stelpaviricetes
- Order: Patatavirales
- Family: Potyviridae
- Genus: Potyvirus
- Species: Potyvirus rapae

= Turnip mosaic virus =

Species of virus

Turnip mosaic virus (TuMV) is a plant virus of the genus Potyvirus in the family Potyviridae. This potyvirus infects more than 300 plant species across over 40 families, including both wild species and also agricultural crops. In Asia, TuMV is considered one of the most devastating viruses, affecting crops such as Chinese cabbage, radish, and Indian mustard. Globally the virus is responsible for yield reductions up to 70%. The symptoms vary with both viral strain and host, but the most common symptoms include chlorotic local lesions, mosaic, mottling, puckering, or rugosity. TuMV is transmitted both horizontally and vertically. At least 89 species of aphids have been identified as vectors, while flea beetles and thrips can also contribute to its dissemination. TuMV can also be transmitted vertically through seeds from parent-to-offspring. The rate of vertical transmission is highly dependent on the host genome, with environmental factors such as light intensity having a significant influence on the seed transmission efficiency. The virus has a thermal inactivation point (TIP) of 62 °C, and a longevity in vitro (LIV) of 3–4 days.

== Structure and Genome ==
TuMV forms flexible and filamentous virions, and its genome consists of a single-stranded, positive-sense linear RNA (+ssRNA) molecules with approximately 9,830 nucleotides. The viral RNA is covantently linked to a genome-linked viral protein (VPg) at the 5' end and features a poly(A) tail at the 3' end. The genome encodes a single open reading frame (ORF) that codes for a large single polyprotein of 300 kDa. This polyprotein is proteolytically cleaved into ten functional proteins designated protein 1 (P1), helper-component proteinase protein (HC-Pro), protein 3 (P3), 6 kDa 1 protein, cylindrical inclusion (CI) protein, 6 kDa 2 protein, VPg, nuclear inclusion a-proteinase protein (NIa-Pro), nuclear inclusion b protein (NIb), and coat protein (CP). In addition, TuMV encodes the protein PIPO (pretty interesting Potyviridae ORF) which is located within the N-terminal region of P3 and it's involved in the cell-to-cell movement.

== Evolution ==
TuMV was originally described in the United States in 1921 from Brassica rapa and it's thought to have originated approximately 1,000 years ago in Europe from a virus that originally infected wild orchids spreading to wild and domestic brassicas.
