= Sven Erik Werner =

Danish composer and musicologist

Sven Erik Werner (1937) is a Danish composer and musicologist. His album Tango Music presents new music for accordion with "a nod" to Astor Piazzolla.

== Recordings ==
- Werner – Passion Fruits : Dramma giocoso. Triplum. Passion Fruits. Traversa. Kuhlau Quartet, Scandinavian Wind Quintet. Da Capo (1994)
- Werner – Tango Music (1994)
- Werner – "Hommage a Bruckner" for choir Danish Radio Choir. Uwe Gronostay
