= Helper-component proteinase =

Identifiers
- EC no.: 3.4.22.45
- CAS no.: 124566-20-7

Databases
- BRENDA: enzyme data
- ExPASy: NiceZyme view
- KEGG: enzyme entry
- MetaCyc: metabolic pathway
- Rhea: reactions
- PDB structures: RCSB PDB PDBe PDBsum
Search
- PMC: articles
- PubMed: articles
- NCBI: proteins

Helper-component proteinase (EC 3.4.22.45, HC-Pro) is an enzyme. This enzyme catalyses the following chemical reaction

Hydrolyses a Gly-Gly bond at its own C-terminus, commonly in the sequence -Tyr-Xaa-Val-Gly-Gly, in the processing of the potyviral polyprotein

This enzyme is present in plant RNA viruses of the Potyviridae family. HC-Pro is encoded by all potyviruses, but is absent in some members of the Ipomovirus genus. HC-Pro is involved in virus transmission, virus polyprotein processing, and suppression of RNA silencing, an antiviral mechanism of plants.
