= Patatavirales =

Virus classification
- (unranked): Virus
- Realm: Riboviria
- Kingdom: Orthornavirae
- Phylum: Pisuviricota
- Class: Stelpaviricetes
- Order: Patatavirales

Order of viruses

Patatavirales is an order of viruses. The order has two families:

- Potyliviridae
- Potyviridae
