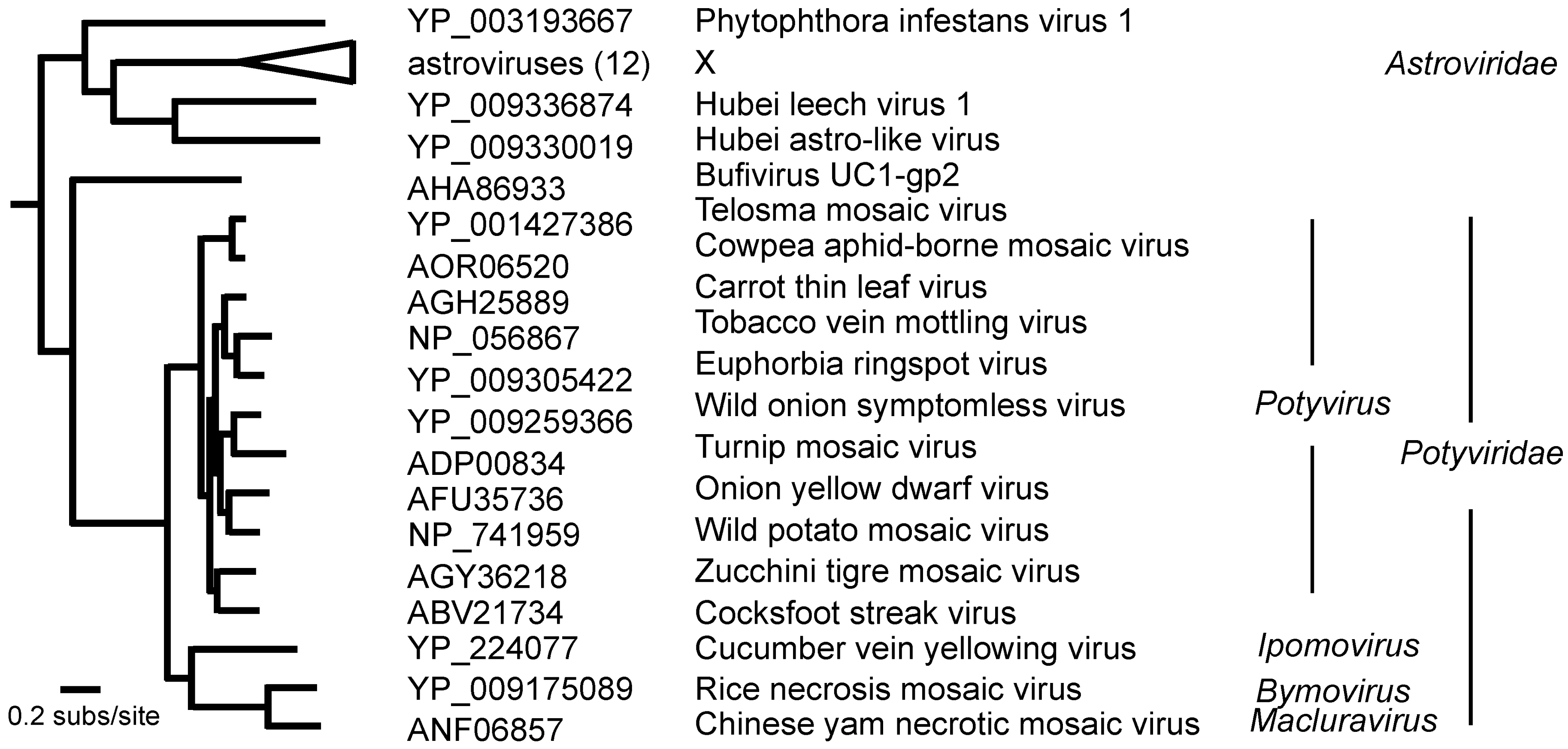
- Phylogentic tree with families Potyviridae and Astroviridae

Virus classification
- (unranked): Virus
- Realm: Riboviria
- Kingdom: Orthornavirae
- Phylum: Pisuviricota
- Class: Stelpaviricetes

= Stelpaviricetes =

Class of virus

Stelpaviricetes is a class of non-enveloped, positive-strand RNA viruses which infect plants and animals. Characteristic of the group is a VPg protein attached to the 5'-end of the genome and a conserved 3C-like protease from the PA clan of proteases for processing the translated polyprotein. The name of the group is a syllabic abbreviation of member orders "stellavirales, patatavirales" with the suffix -viricetes denoting a virus class.

== Orders ==
The following orders are recognized:

- Hypofuvirales
- Patatavirales
- Stellavirales
