= Ligustilide =

Names
- Other names 3-Butylidene-4,5-dihydrophthalide

Identifiers
CAS Number	4431-01-0
3D model (JSmol)	Interactive image
ChemSpider	461606
ECHA InfoCard	100.237.128
EC Number	809-243-4
PubChem CID	529865
UNII	10HE68JD06
- InChI: InChI=1S/C12H14O2/c1-2-3-8-11-9-6-4-5-7-10(9)12(13)14-11/h5,7-8H,2-4,6H2,1H3 Key: IQVQXVFMNOFTMU-UHFFFAOYSA-N
- SMILES: O=C1OC(=CCCC)C2=C1C=CCC2

Properties
Chemical formula	C_{12}H_{14}O_{2}
Molar mass	190.242 g·mol^{−1}

Hazards
- GHS labelling
Pictograms	(GHS06: Toxic)
Signal word	Danger
Hazard statements	H301
- Except where otherwise noted, data are given for materials in their standard state (at 25 °C [77 °F], 100 kPa). Infobox references

Ligustilide is a natural chemical compound of the dihydrophthalide class. Ligustilide is found in the highest concentration in wild celeries (Apium graveolens). It has also been found in Angelica sinensis and a variety of other plants including Todaroa montana.

== Potential pharmacology ==
Because of the traditional use of Angelica sinesis in herbal medicine, particularly traditional Chinese medicine where it is known as dong quai, there has been interest in identifying chemical compounds responsible for its putative pharmacological effects. Ligustilide is typically identified as the principal bioactive component. A variety of in vitro effects of ligustilide have been reported, including antiinflammatory and neuroprotective effects. However, because of the chemical instability of ligustilide, the relevance of these studies to any effects in humans is uncertain.

== Herbal extract ==
Ligustilide is a volatile compound, found in the essential oil of various herb roots. The oil is obtained by distillation or supercritical CO_{2} extraction of the dried root. In one report, total (Z)-ligustilide content in Angelica acutiloba root samples ranged from 0.08% to 0.22%. In an other report, ligustilide was not mentioned as a component in hydrodistilled essential oil of Angelica archangelica root from Serbia. When dried whole root is used, as in traditional Chinese medicine, the pharmacological effect may be ascribed to a range of components, including polysaccharides.
