= Apium virus Y =

Virus classification
- (unranked): Virus
- Realm: Riboviria
- Kingdom: Orthornavirae
- Phylum: Pisuviricota
- Class: Stelpaviricetes
- Order: Patatavirales
- Family: Potyviridae
- Genus: Potyvirus
- Species: Potyvirus apii

Species of virus

Apium virus Y (ApVY) is a plant pathogenic virus in the genus Potyvirus and the virus family Potyviridae.

Apium virus Y was first found in Australia in 2002 in poison hemlock (Conium maculatum: an immigrant weed in Australia). A survey of native and weed species in the family Apiaceae found ApVY to be widespread in Australia. In addition, this survey and others found two other potyviruses. One was a well-known potyvirus infecting the Apiaceae, Celery mosaic virus (CeMV). CeMV has been found in celery (Apium graveolens) crops worldwide, including Australia, New Zealand and the US. The third potyvirus found in these surveys was another previously unknown potyvirus, Carrot virus Y (CarVY).

== Geographic distribution ==
Since its sequence was first deposited in GenBank, ApVY has been found in New Zealand, Florida, Washington state and California in the United States, and Turkey.

In New Zealand, it was found in celery in a mixed infection with CeMV. Two different strains of ApVY were found in Washington state, one in domestic celery crops and other in the weed poison hemlock. The one in celery was 98% identical to the Australian nucleotide sequences. The one found in naturally infected poison hemlock was only 91% identical to the sequences from Australia. The later turned out to be 98% identical to the North American isolates found in Florida and California. In turn, the Florida isolate was 90-91% identical to the Australian isolates.

A third strain of this virus has been known in Germany since the early 1990s. Sequences of this virus isolated from parsley (Petroselinum crispum) were 94% identical to the Australian isolate from parsley.

ApVY was recently also found in Balıkesir province of Turkey, and might be distributed widely there as all 10 symptomatic parsley samples were tested positive using RT-PCR detection method. The study also successfully generated a new pair of primer for amplification of 1066 bp of ApVY genome, including the complete coat protein (CP) gene. Three of the four sequenced Turkish isolates shared a common ancestor with two Slovenian isolates which placed them in the same phylogenetic group, while another one was grouped with five USA isolates.

== Host range and symptoms ==
In addition to cultivated celery and parsley, and the weed poison hemlock, natural ApVY infections have been identified in sea celery (Apium prostratum), cilantro (Coriandrum sativum), and bishop's weed (Ammi majus). It has been found to be transmitted by aphid to celeriac (celery root, Apium graveolens var. rapaceum) cultivars in California. All are members of the plant family Apiaceae. In another host range study, the virus causes local lesions and other symptoms on Chenopodium quinoa, Blitum capitatum, and Beta macrocarpa which belong to Amaranthaceae.

Symptoms reported included mosaic, vein clearing or banding, necrotic/chlorotic line patterns and stunting. Some samples of parsley, celery and poison hemlock, that gave positive results in tests, however, were asymptomatic.
