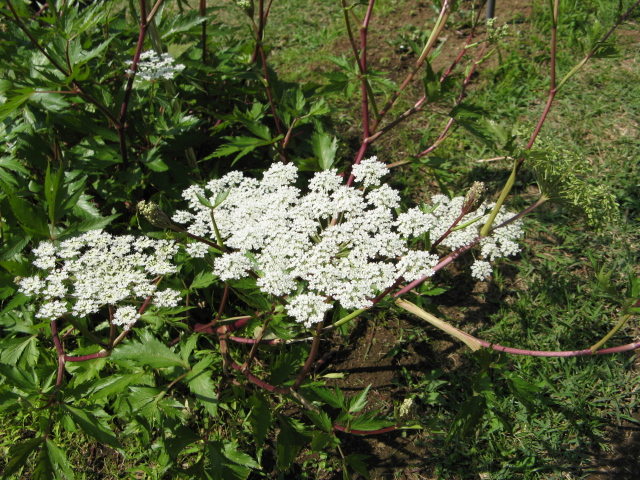
- A. acutiloba

Scientific classification
- Kingdom: Plantae
- Clade: Embryophytes
- Clade: Tracheophytes
- Clade: Spermatophytes
- Clade: Angiosperms
- Clade: Eudicots
- Clade: Asterids
- Order: Apiales
- Family: Apiaceae
- Genus: Angelica
- Species: A. acutiloba

Binomial name
- Angelica acutiloba (Siebold & Zucc.) Kitag. 1937

Varieties
- A. acutiloba var. acutiloba; A. acutiloba var. iwatensis; A. acutiloba Kitag. var. sugiyamae

= Angelica acutiloba =

Species of flowering plant

Angelica acutiloba is a perennial herb from the family Apiaceae or Umbelliferous (carrot or parsley family). It is predominately in Japan and perhaps endemic (unique). It is now distributed widely and cultivated in Jilin, China, Korea, Taiwan and Indonesia.

The common name of Angelica acutiloba is known as tōki (トウキ, 当帰) in Japanese. The root was used as a substitute for the crude drug tōki (当帰) in Kampō medicine (漢方製薬 Kanpō Seiyaku), which is a Japanese adaptation of Traditional Chinese medicine.

The Traditional Chinese medicine uses the root of a different species A. sinensis, Chinese: 当归; pinyin: dāngguī. The Latin pharmacological name for the crude drug, Radix Angelica sinensis, refers to the dried roots of A. sinensis. In China, as a substitute species, A. acutiloba, is known as Chinese: 东当归; pinyin: dōngdāngguī. Literally “东” means “eastern” or “东洋”, which is equivalent to the meaning of Japan. So the medicine is also called as Japanese Angelica root. (See #Etymology) The Japanese name, tōki (トウキ, 当帰), has a literally meaning like “recovering good health”.

== Taxonomy and distribution ==
- A. acutiloba var. acutiloba (Siebold et Zucc.) Kitag. (miyama-tōki (ミヤマトウキ)) (深山当帰)
- A. acutiloba var. iwatensis Hikino (miyama-tōki (ミヤマトウキ)) (南部当帰)

A. acutiloba var. acutiloba grows in the banks and valleys, from Honshu (North of Shiga Prefecture) to Hokkaido. While A. acutiloba var. iwatensis grows in high altitude, mountainous terrains and grasslands, distributed throughout temperate areas.

The crop cultivated in Nara Prefecture has been known as Yamato tōki or Ōfuka-tōki (the latter after Ōfukachō in Gojō, Nara), reputedly superior to the Hokkaido-grown Hokkai tōki, and though the latter has been classed as a subspecies in the past, it is assigned a senior category of variety:

- A. acutiloba Kitag. var. sugiyamae Hikino (hokkai-tōki (ホッカイトウキ))
- A. acutiloba forma tsukubana Hikino in Act. Phytotax. Geobot. XVII 84 (1958). (tsukuba-tōki (ツクバトウキ))

== Description ==
A. acutiloba grows to about 0.3-1 meter high. The color of the stems is from reddish to purplish. The stems are erect, glabrous and thinly ribbed. The leaves are deep green, and alternately arranged, often in a leathery or fleshy texture. In most cases, the lower and basal leaves are petiolate or perfoliate. The petioles attached to them are about 10–30 cm in length. The mature blades are one or two pinnatified. Young blades are usually three pinnatifid.

The leaves are of variable sizes. The upper leaves are simplified to oblong, with lanceolate and dentate incised blades. The leaf lobes are about 2–9 cm long and 1–3 cm wide. Most leaves are sessile, but sometimes they bear short stalks. The tips of the mature leaves are acuminate to acute and the bases of them are cuneate to truncate.

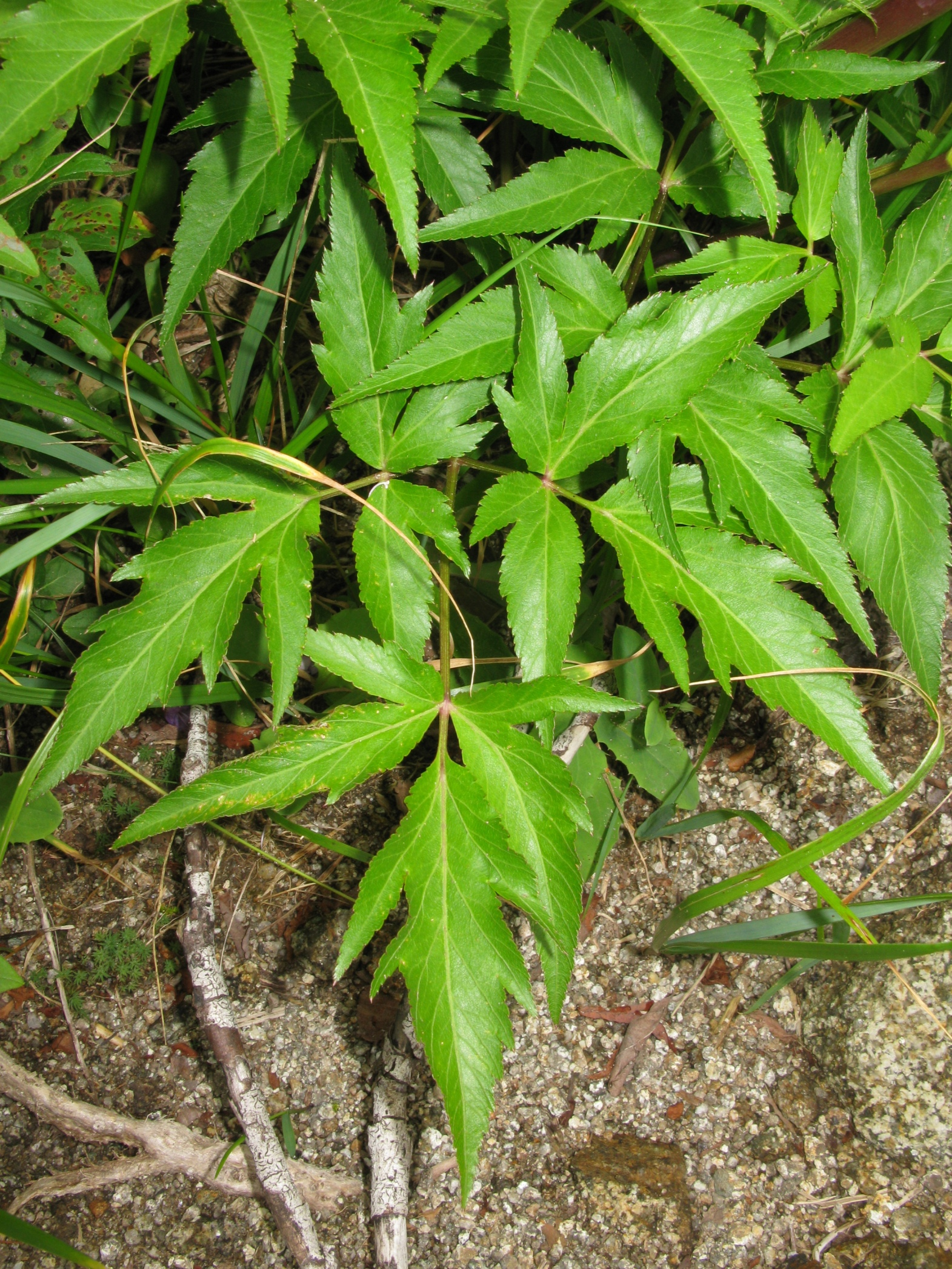
Angelica acutiloba subsp. iwatensis

== Flowers and fruits ==
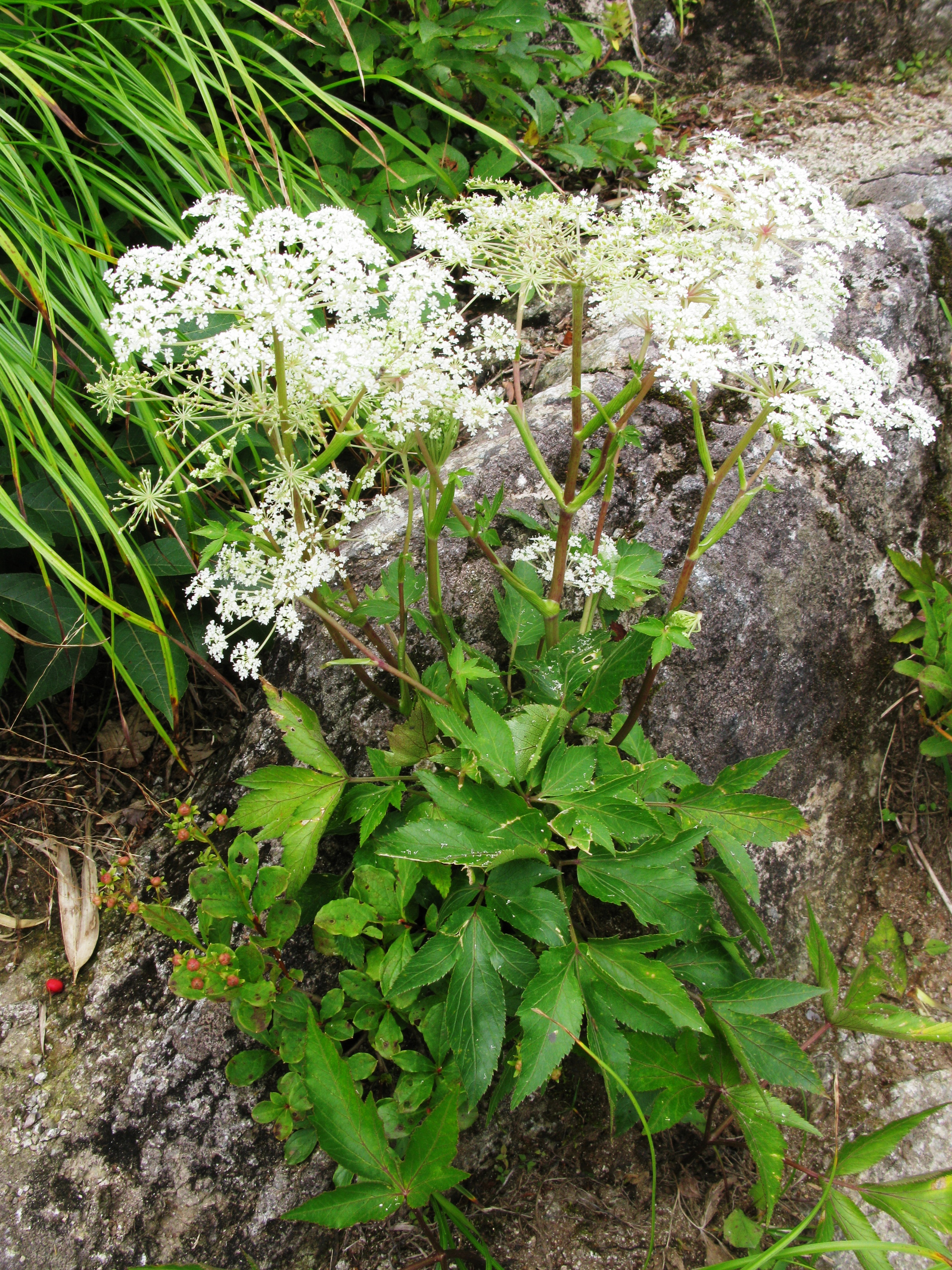
Angelica acutiloba subsp. iwatensis

The flowers are characterized as the inflorescence: a compound umbel. A. acutiloba's flowers are perfect or hermaphroditic and actinomorphic, with distinct calyx and white corolla. However, the calyx is often reduced with obsolete calyx teeth. The flowers have five petals, sepals, and stamens. The white petals are often obovate to oblong. The inflorescences contain fifteen to forty-five pubescent rays, 1–10 cm in length, which surround about thirty small disk flowers. The peduncles which hold the entire inflorescence are glabrous or pubescent and 5–20 cm long. While the stalks of each single flower in the flower clusters called pedicels, are thin and often sessile. The whorl of bracts beneath the inflorescences is called involucre. It consists of phyllaries, modified bracts, which are linear-lanceolate or linear and 1–2 cm long. It also consists of smaller young phyllaries, which are glabrous and 5–15 mm long. The androecium contains five stamens, while the gynoecium contains two carpels fused into a single pistil with an inferior, glabrous ovary. The plant blossoms from July to August. When mature, flowers secrete nectar. The strong floral scent attracts pollinators like insects.

The fruits are schizocarps of two mericarps derived from mature fused carpels, often narrow-oblong with 4–5 mm in length and 1-1.5 mm in diameter. A single seed is formed with each mericarp. When mature, it is dispersed by wind. The cremocarp of the fruit is narrow-oblong and slightly flat. The oil tubes in the fruit, 3 or 4 vittae, form in wrinkles of ridges of the fruit, while 4 to 8 vittae can be found in commissure. The plant bears fruit from August to September.

== Roots ==
The color of the roots is dark brown to red-brown. The roots are cylindrical, 10–25 cm long and 1–2.5 cm thick in diameter. Numerous lateral horsetail-like branched roots, which are nearly fusiform and 0.2–1 cm in diameter, sprout out from the main tap root. The externals of the roots are covered with horizontal protrusions, numerous scars of fine rootlets, and longitudinal wrinkles, which are about 1.5–3 cm in diameter. Dried roots are easy to break, while, moist roots are relatively soft. The roots contain yellow-white or light brown xylems. The roots have a pungent aromas and they have a slightly sweet taste and followed by a bitter taste.

== Cultivation and propagation ==
A. acutiloba grows in moist clay soils. It prefers sunlight, but can grow in shady woodland. Cool climate is suitable for its optimal cultivation. The sowing season is usually the spring during March and May. The plant may be affected by a variety of diseases. As a result, the leaves may wilt or become yellow. Pests like aphids, worms and mites may affect the plant growth as well.

Cold temperature, water and sunlight are preferred for seed germination. In the spring, the seeds may germinate slower than in winter because of the warmer temperature. In some cases, the seeds of A. acutiloba are sown in the first winter and moved to their permanent position at the beginning of next spring for their best germination.

== Chemistry ==
The extract of A. acutiloba roots contains many chemical constituents. It may contain about 2% volatile oils, such as ligustilide, n-butylidenephthalide, folic acid, linoleic acid, safrole, and isosafrole.

== Uses ==
=== Traditional medicine ===
The extract of A. acutiloba roots is used in traditional Chinese medicine and is considered a substitute for dang gui, Angelica sinensis. In Kampo medicine, A. acutioloba roots are used to treat gynaecological diseases in the female reproductive system.

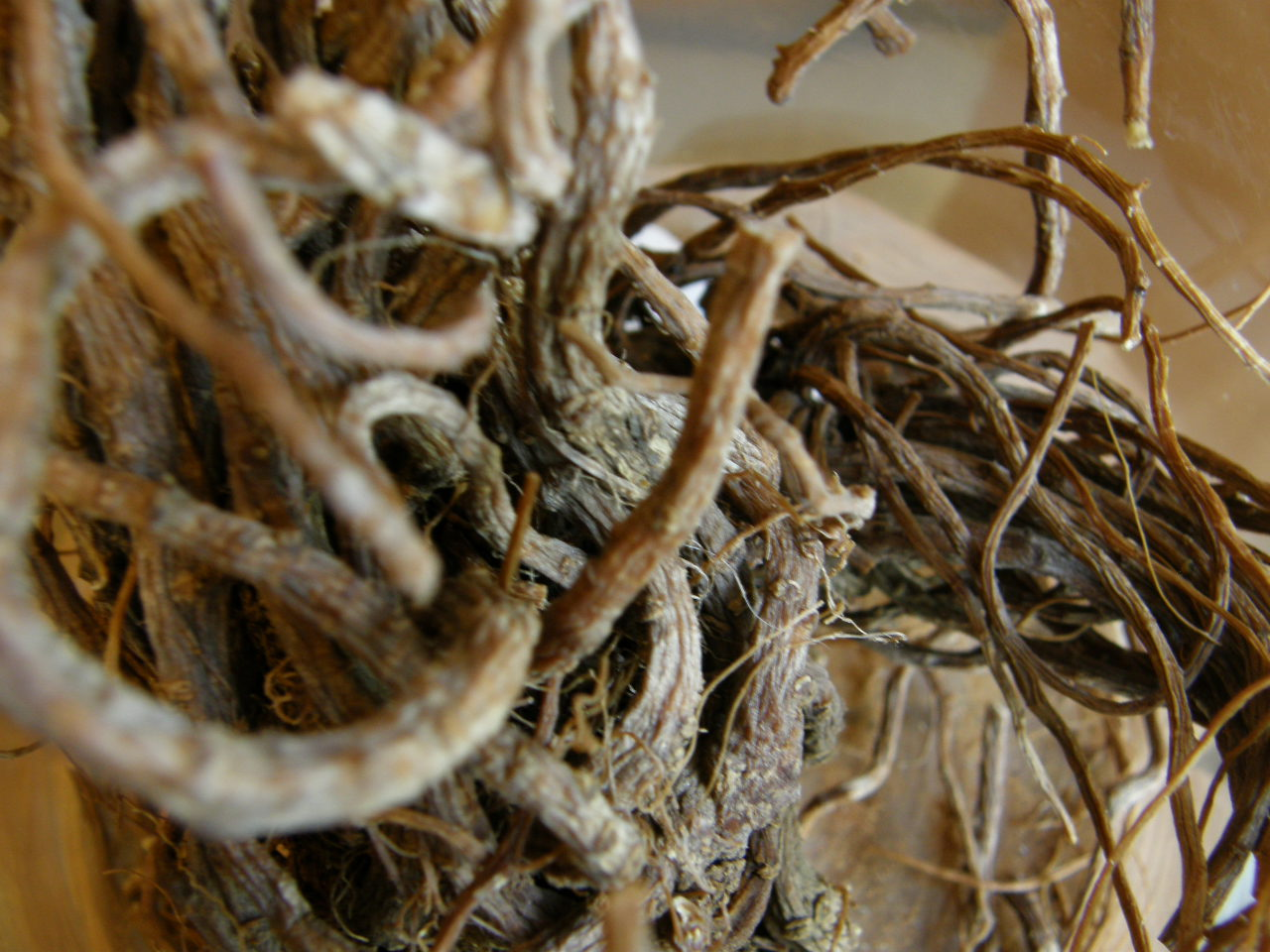
Angelica acutiloba

=== Other uses ===
The leaves of the plant are edible. A. acutiloba is used as an ornamental plant in gardens. The root extract can be used in cosmetics and act as a moisturizer, which may help to prevent the aging of the skin.

== Toxicity and insecticidal properties ==
Angelica acutiloba contains furocoumarins, which increase skin sensitivity to sunlight and may cause dermatitis. The furocoumarins produced by plants are toxic and often utilized as a self-defense mechanism to prevent plants from predators. According to a study, phthalides and furanocoumarins extracted from the A. acutiloba root can be utilized as a natural insecticide, and against larvae and adult Drosophila melanogaster.

== Etymology ==
The Japanese name tōki (当帰) is directly derived from the same Chinese characters simplified Chinese: 当归; traditional Chinese: 當歸 or Tang Kuei.(See wiktionary)

It is sometimes confusing between two species: A. sinensis and A. acutiloba. A. sinensis is commonly used in traditional Chinese medicine and known as “当归”. Chinese denote A. acutiloba as “东当归”, meaning Japanese Danggui. However, A. sinensis in Japanese is known as kara-tōki (カラトウキ, 唐当帰, "Chinese tōki"), meaning Chinese Danggui. While Japanese have given name for A. acutiloba as tōki (トウキ, 当帰).

The Chinese characters "当归" or "當歸" literally mean “return”. In 'Shénnóng Běn Cǎo Jīng' (simplified Chinese: 神农本草经; traditional Chinese: 神農本草經), Angelica plant had been recorded as a very important herbal medicine in traditional Chinese medicine. In ancient times, a husband might leave the house if his wife was suffering from a gynecological disease. The wife drank the medicine made from Angelica root. Surprisingly, her disease was cured. Meanwhile, her husband believed he should go home as his wife became healthy again. As a result, people gave name of the plant with the meaning of “return”. But the fact is still uncertain.

Bencao Gangmu (本草綱目), written by Li Shizhen in the 17th century, provides an explanation of the original name of the plant. In ancient days, married women were responsible for bearing the offspring. Angelica root was a great medicine that could help to regulate women's blood flow, so it implied that her missing for her husband and she was ready to marry him. The meaning of the plant might also refer to "wedding or marriage" or "归嫁/帰嫁".
