= Beet soil-borne mosaic virus =

Virus classification
- (unranked): Virus
- Realm: Riboviria
- Kingdom: Orthornavirae
- Phylum: Kitrinoviricota
- Class: Alsuviricetes
- Order: Hepelivirales
- Family: Benyviridae
- Genus: Benyvirus
- Species: Benyvirus solibetae

Synonyms
- Beet soil-borne mosaic virus (BSBMV)

Species of virus

Beet soil-borne mosaic virus (BSBMV) is a plant pathogenic virus. It is a mosaic virus and a soil borne pathogen affecting beetroot. It is related to the Beet necrotic yellow vein virus (BNYVV), having identical genome organization and both belonging to the same genus. As of 2018, its occurrence is limited to the United States.

Like BNYVV, it can be transmitted by Polymyxa betae. Besides beetroot, both can infect tobacco and Beta macrocarpa. Hybrids (reassortant) between this virus and BNYVV are also infective.
