= C12H18O2 =

The molecular formula C_{12}H_{18}O_{2} (molar mass: 194.27 g/mol, exact mass: 194.1307 u) may refer to:

- 2,5-Dimethoxy-p-cymene, or thymohydroquinone dimethyl ether
- Hexylresorcinol
- Sedanolide
