= Aspergillus pachycaulis =

Scientific classification
- Kingdom: Fungi
- Division: Ascomycota
- Class: Eurotiomycetes
- Order: Eurotiales
- Family: Aspergillaceae
- Genus: Aspergillus
- Species: A. pachycaulis

Binomial name
- Aspergillus pachycaulis Sklenar, S.W. Peterson, Jurjević & Hubka (2017)

Species of fungus

Aspergillus pachycaulis is a species of fungus in the genus Aspergillus. It is from the Robusti section. The species was first described in 2017. It has been isolated from air in the United States. It has been reported to produce asperphenamate, indole alkaloid A, indole alkaloid B, phthalide, and mycophenolic acid.
