= Leaf celery =

Subspecies of flowering plant

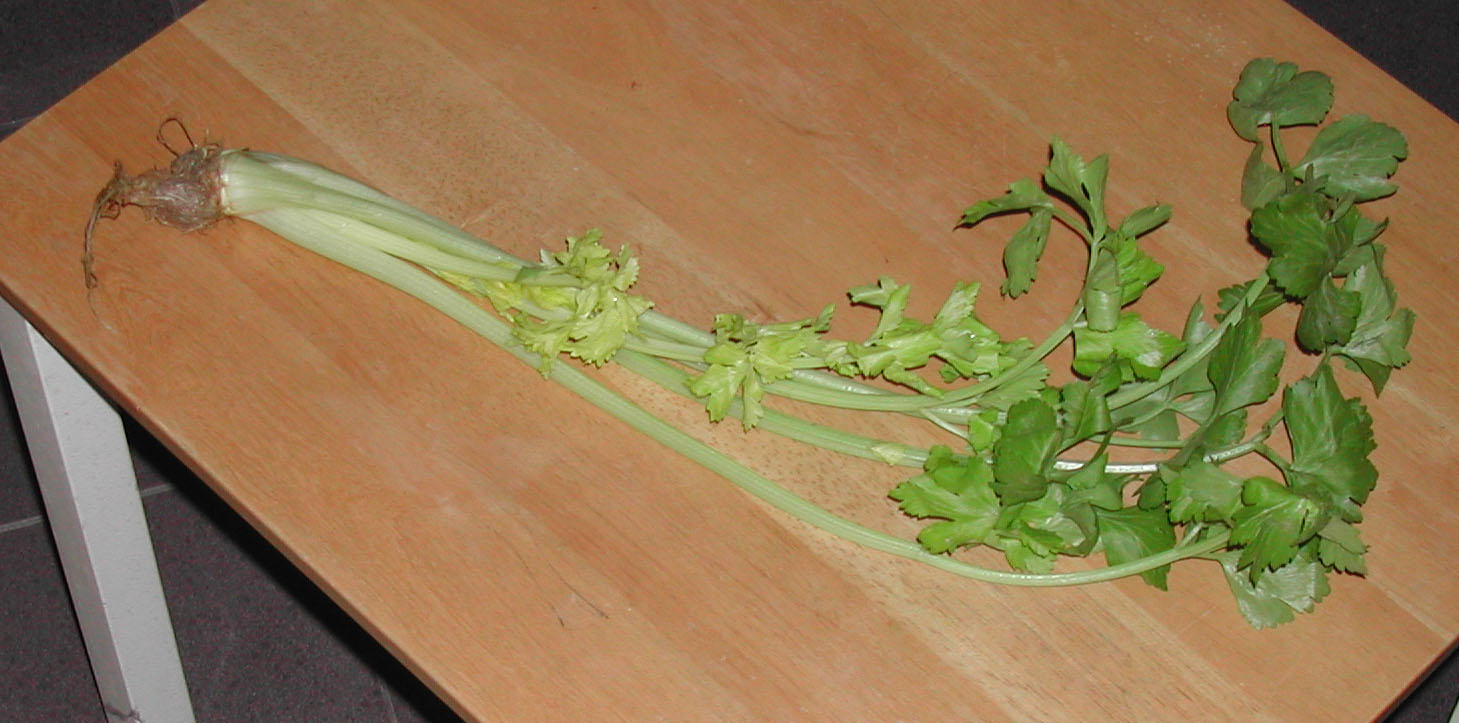
- Genus: Apium
- Species: Apium graveolens
- Cultivar group: Secalinum Group

Leaf celery (Apium graveolens Secalinum Group or Apium graveolens var. secalinum), also called Chinese celery, Nan Ling celery, smallage or parcel (par-cel) is a group of cultivars of Apium graveolens cultivated in East Asian countries for their edible, flavorful stalks and leaves.

The stems are thinner than those of Western celery, and curved into round, hollow stalks. Also, unlike with Western celery, the leaves are used as well as the stalks. It has a stronger taste and smell compared to celery. It is used as a flavoring in soups and sometimes pickled as a side dish.

== See also ==
- Celery
- Celeriac
- List of vegetables
- Oenanthe javanica - aka "Chinese celery" or seri (セリ; "Japanese parsley")
