= Celery vase =

Tableware

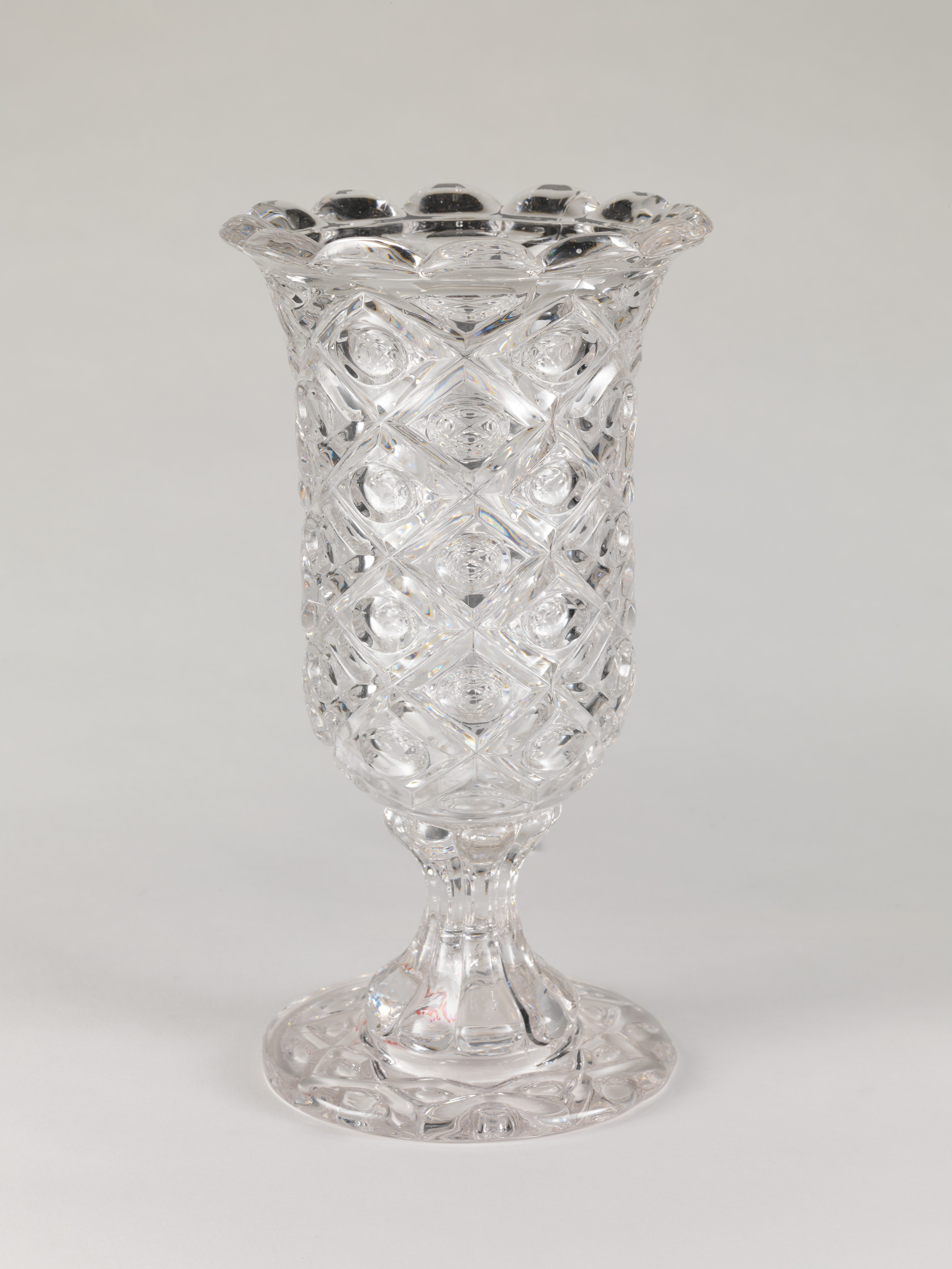
A press glass celery vase, produced between 1850–1870, in the collection of the Metropolitan Museum of Art

A celery vase is type of glass tableware. Developed during the Victorian era, celery vases displayed celery as centerpieces during meals.

Farmers began cultivating celery in eastern England after its introduction in the early 19th century. It was hard to grow, making it a luxury food item. As a result, upper and middle class Victorian households would display their raw celery in special vases. The vases were available in ceramic and silver, however, glass was preferred so the celery could be seen in the vase by diners. They were often displayed as dining table centerpieces, either as a stand alone display or to complement a celery dish or dip.

Celery vases were advertised in the United States as early as 1801 and continued to be promoted by retailers, women's journalism, and etiquette manuals. The latter promoted celery to be displayed in the vases and consumed during the salad course.

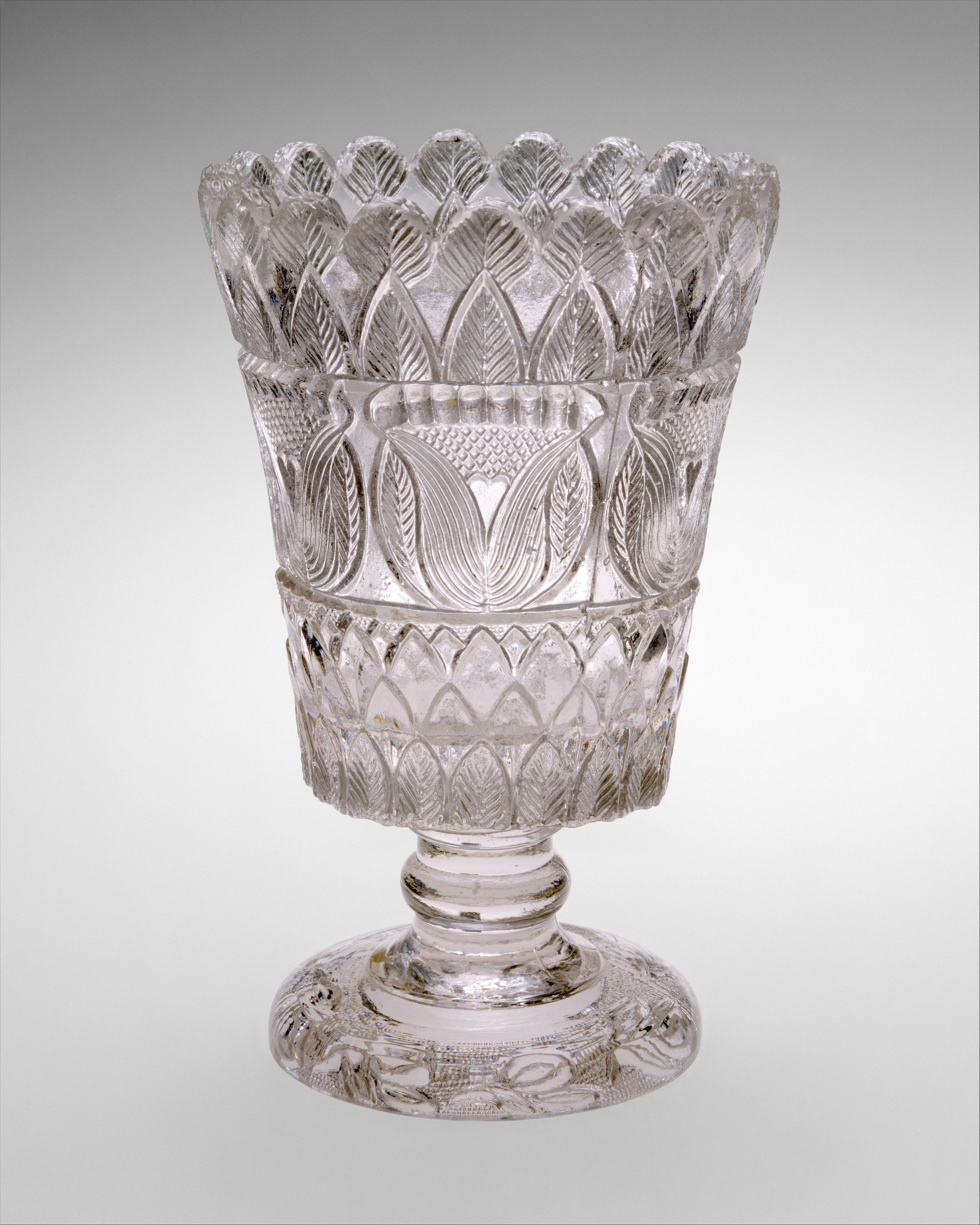
Celery vase by the Boston and Sandwich Glass Company, held at the Metropolitan Museum of Art

The vases were common wedding gifts and often were engraved with the newlyweds’ names on the bottom. The vases began to decline in popularity by 1900. Eventually, the mass production of celery vases and the increasingly easier process of growing celery caused a decline in the vases' popularity. A 1916 cookbook featured a "Celery in Glass" recipe.

The Metropolitan Museum of Art has a collection of celery vases.
