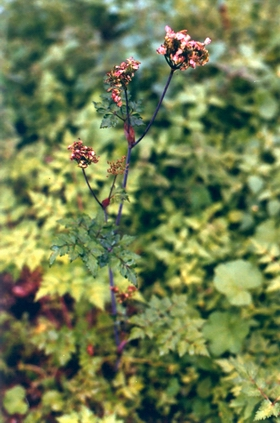

Scientific classification
- Kingdom: Plantae
- Clade: Tracheophytes
- Clade: Angiosperms
- Clade: Eudicots
- Clade: Asterids
- Order: Apiales
- Family: Apiaceae
- Genus: Angelica
- Species: A. sinensis

Binomial name
- Angelica sinensis (Oliv.) Diels

Synonyms
- Angelica omeiensis C.Q.Yuan & R.H.Shan; Angelica wilsonii H.Wolff

= Angelica sinensis =

Species of flowering plant

Angelica sinensis, commonly known as dong quai (simplified Chinese: 当归; traditional Chinese: 當歸; pinyin: dāngguī; Jyutping: dong1 gwai1; Pe̍h-ōe-jī: tong-kui) or female ginseng, is a herb belonging to the family Apiaceae, indigenous to China. A. sinensis grows in cool high altitude mountains in East Asia. There is no scientific evidence that A. sinensis is effective for any medicinal purpose.

== Cultivation ==
Angelica is hardy to 5 °C (41 °F) and can be cultivated at elevations of 1,500 to 3,000 metres (5,000–10,000 ft). Seedlings need to be kept out of direct sunlight, but the mature plant can withstand it. Angelica requires deep moist fertile soil and is perennial if prevented from going to seed.

== Use in traditional Chinese medicine ==
The dried root of A. sinensis is commonly known as Chinese angelica (Chinese: 當歸; pinyin: dāngguī; Pe̍h-ōe-jī: tong-kui) and is widely used in Chinese traditional medicine in the belief it benefits women's health, cardiovascular conditions, osteoarthritis, inflammation, headache, infections, mild anemia, fatigue and high blood pressure. The herb's Chinese name "dong quai" (當歸) means that a husband shall return to his wife, which is implicitly said to help women's sexual health.

Overall, the U.S. National Library of Medicine states that more evidence is needed to rate the effectiveness of dong quai for most uses.

=== Adverse effects ===
There is evidence that A. sinensis may affect the muscles of the uterus. Women who are pregnant or planning on becoming pregnant should not use A. sinensis, because it may induce a miscarriage. Taking A. sinensis can cause skin to become extra sensitive to the sun, leading to a greater risk for skin cancer. One case of gynaecomastia has been reported following consumption of dong quai root powder pills.

== Anticoagulant effect ==
A. sinensis may increase the anticoagulant effects of the drug warfarin (as it contains coumarins), and consequently may increase the risk of bleeding. Caution is needed when consumed with herbs (such as ginkgo or garlic), which may affect blood clotting.

== Phytochemicals ==
Phytochemicals contained in A. sinensis include phytosterols, polysaccharides, ligustilide, butylphthalide, cnidilide, isocnidilide, p-cymene, ferulate, and flavonoids.

== See also ==
- Angelica
- Chinese herbology
- Scutellaria baicalensis (Baikal skullcap)
- Eleutherococcus senticosus or Siberian ginseng
