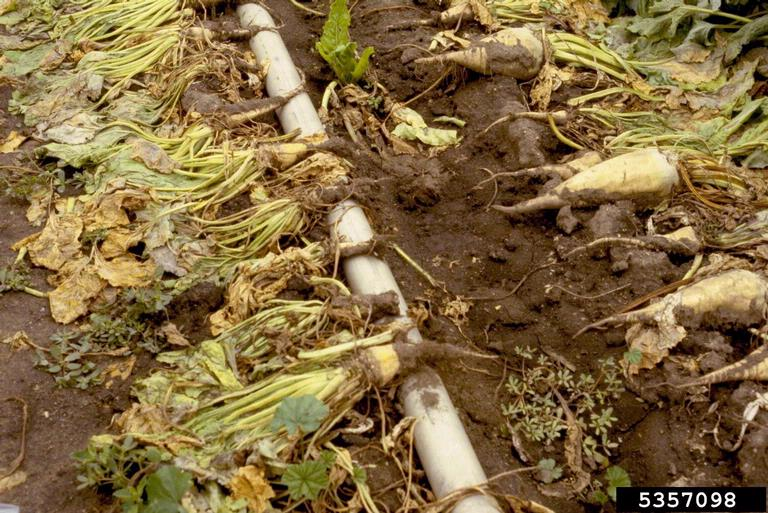
- Beet Necrotic Yellow Vein Virus

Virus classification
- (unranked): Virus
- Realm: Riboviria
- Kingdom: Orthornavirae
- Phylum: Kitrinoviricota
- Class: Alsuviricetes
- Order: Hepelivirales
- Family: Benyviridae
- Genus: Benyvirus

Species
- See text

= Benyvirus =

Genus of viruses

Benyvirus is a genus of viruses, in the family Benyviridae. Plants serve as natural hosts. There are five species in this genus. Diseases associated with this genus include: BNYVV: rhizomania.

== Taxonomy ==
The genus contains the following species, listed by scientific name and followed by the exemplar virus of the species:

- Benyvirus arctii, Burdock mottle virus
- Benyvirus necrobetae, Beet necrotic yellow vein virus
- Benyvirus oryzae, Rice stripe necrosis virus, isolates of which are known as RSNV; a rod-shaped virus containing just six open reading frames in its genome. A pathogen of rice plants, it may cause chlorosis, necrosis, and malformation.
- Benyvirus solibetae, Beet soil-borne mosaic virus
- Benyvirus tritici, Wheat stripe mosaic virus

== Structure ==
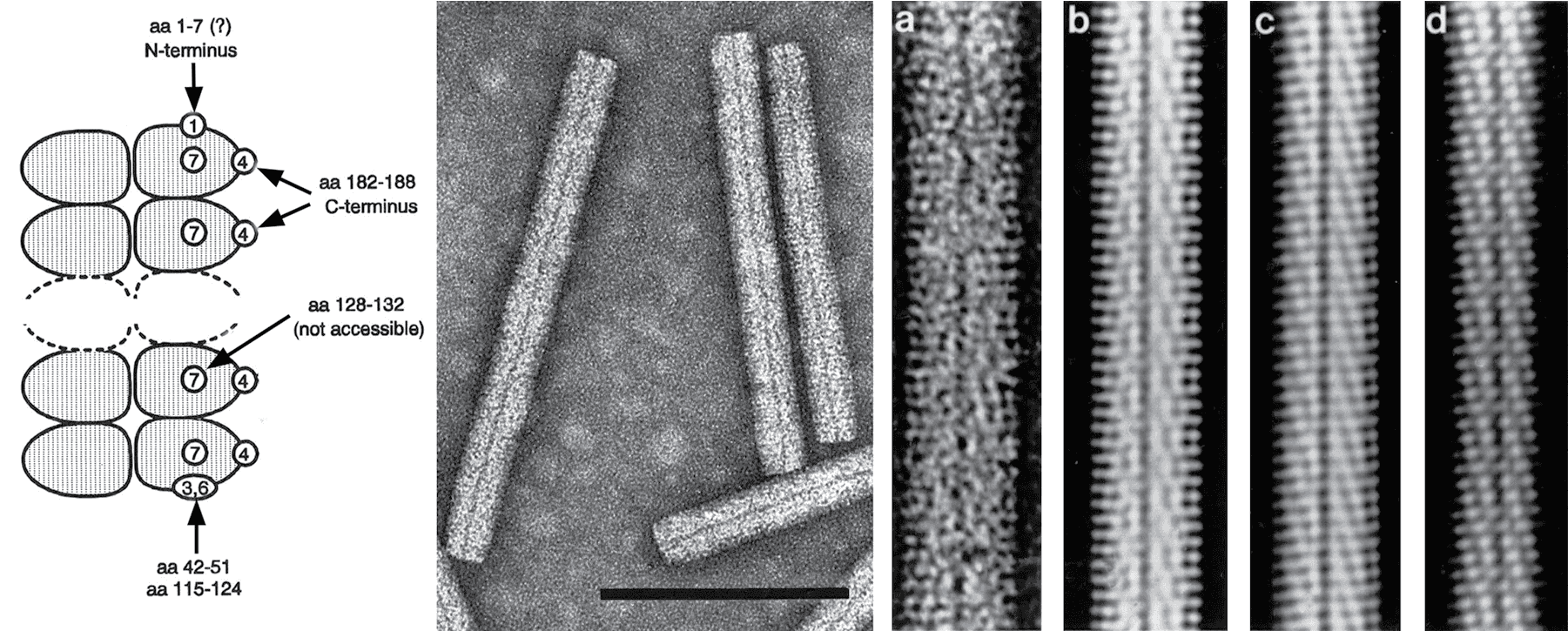
(Left) Scheme showing the accessibility to antibodies of various parts of the coat protein amino acid (aa) sequence in particles of BNYVV. Encircled numbers designate different epitopes. (Center) Negative contrast electron micrograph of stained purified particles of BNYVV. (Right) From left (a) negative contrast electron micrograph of a BNYVV particle and (b, c, d) computer-filtered micrographs of BNYVV particle.

Viruses in the genus Benyvirus are non-enveloped, with rod-shaped geometries. The diameter is around 20 nm, with a length of 85–390 nm. Genomes are linear and segmented, around 6.7kb in length.

Genus	Structure	Symmetry	Capsid	Genomic arrangement	Genomic segmentation
Benyvirus	Rod-shaped		Non-enveloped	Linear	Segmented

== Life cycle ==
Viral replication is cytoplasmic. Entry into the host cell is achieved by penetration into the host cell. Replication follows the positive stranded RNA virus replication model. Positive stranded RNA virus transcription is the method of transcription. The virus exits the host cell by tripartite non-tubule guided viral movement. Plant serve as the natural host. The virus is transmitted via a vector (protozoan). Transmission routes are vector.

Genus	Host details	Tissue tropism	Entry details	Release details	Replication site	Assembly site	Transmission
Benyvirus	Plants	None	Viral movement; mechanical inoculation	Viral movement	Cytoplasm	Cytoplasm	Vector=protozoan
