= Sedanolide =

Names
- IUPAC name 3-Butyl-3a,4,5,6-tetrahydro-2-benzofuran-1(3H)-one
- Other names Sedanolide; 3-Butyl-3a,4,5,6-tetrahydrophthalide

Identifiers
CAS Number	6415-59-4
3D model (JSmol)	Interactive image
ChemSpider	4197506
PubChem CID	5018391
UNII	9GXU758IFX
CompTox Dashboard (EPA)	DTXSID001027843
- InChI: InChI=1S/C12H18O2/c1-2-3-8-11-9-6-4-5-7-10(9)12(13)14-11/h7,9,11H,2-6,8H2,1H3 Key: UPJFTVFLSIQQAV-UHFFFAOYSA-N
- SMILES: CCCCC1C2CCCC=C2C(=O)O1

Properties
Chemical formula	C_{12}H_{18}O_{2}
Molar mass	194.274 g·mol^{−1}

Related compounds
Related compounds	Phthalide
- Except where otherwise noted, data are given for materials in their standard state (at 25 °C [77 °F], 100 kPa). Infobox references

Sedanolide is a tetrahydrophthalide compound with the molecular formula C_{12}H_{18}O_{2}. It is reported that sedanolide is one of the flavor constituents of celery oil from fresh celery.

== Isomers ==
There are 4 stereo isomers.

- (3R,3aR)-sedanolide
- (3R,3aS)-sedanolide
- (3S,3aR)-sedanolide - Also called neocnidilide or trans-sedanolide.
- (3S,3aS)-sedanolide

== Similar compounds ==
3-Butylphthalide

Sedanenolide (sometimes called senkyunolide)
- cnidilide
- 3-butylhexahydrophthalide
