= Celery =

Species of edible plant

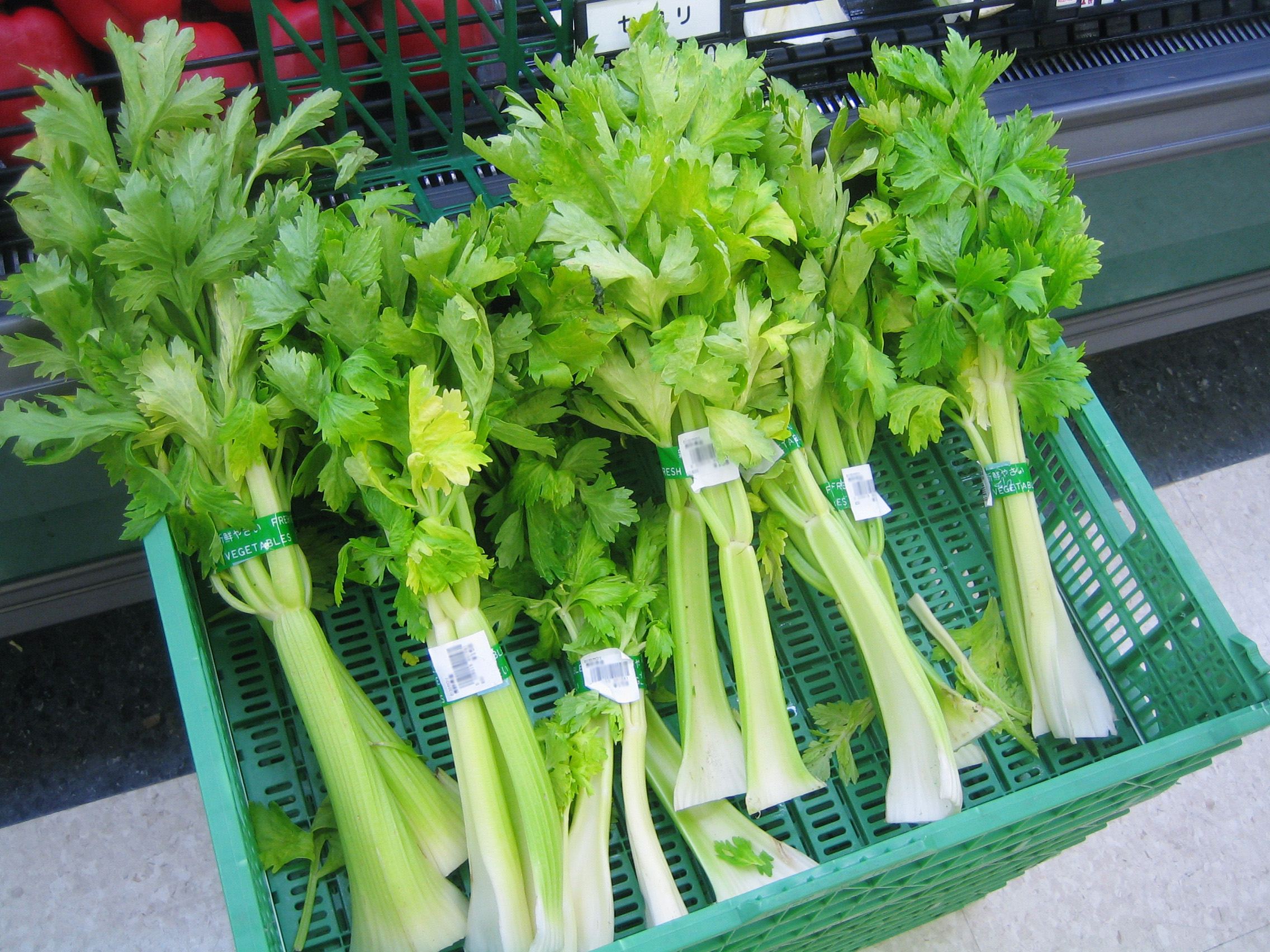
- Celery for sale
- Genus: Apium
- Species: Apium graveolens
- Cultivar group: Dulce Group

Celery (Apium graveolens Dulce Group or Apium graveolens var. dulce) is a cultivated plant belonging to the species Apium graveolens in the family Apiaceae that has been used as a vegetable since ancient times.

The original wild species has been selectively bred over centuries into three primary cultivar groups: stalk celery (Dulce Group), consumed for its fibrous edible stalks; leaf celery (Secalinum Group), grown for its aromatic leaves; and celeriac (Rapaceum Group), cultivated for its large, edible hypocotyl. Celery is characterized by its long, ribbed stalks, pinnate leaves, and small white flowers arranged in umbels.

Celery is commonly consumed raw in salads, cooked in soups and stews, or juiced. Celery seeds, which have a strong, aromatic flavor, are used as a spice or processed into celery salt. Celery is among a large group of foods that may provoke allergic reactions.

Historically, celery has held culinary and symbolic significance. Literary evidence indicates celery cultivation in Ancient Greece, while ancient Egyptians incorporated it into funeral garlands. Celery remains eaten around the world.

== Description ==
Celery leaves are pinnate to bipinnate with rhombic leaflets 3–6 centimetres (1–2 1/2 inches) long and 2–4 cm (1–1 1/2 in) broad. The flowers are creamy-white, 2–3 mm (3/32–1/8 in) in diameter, and are produced in dense compound umbels. The seeds are broad ovoid to globose, 1.5–2 mm (1/16–5/64 in) long and wide. Modern cultivars have been selected for either solid petioles, leaf stalks, or a large hypocotyl. A celery stalk readily separates into "strings" which are bundles of angular collenchyma cells exterior to the vascular bundles.

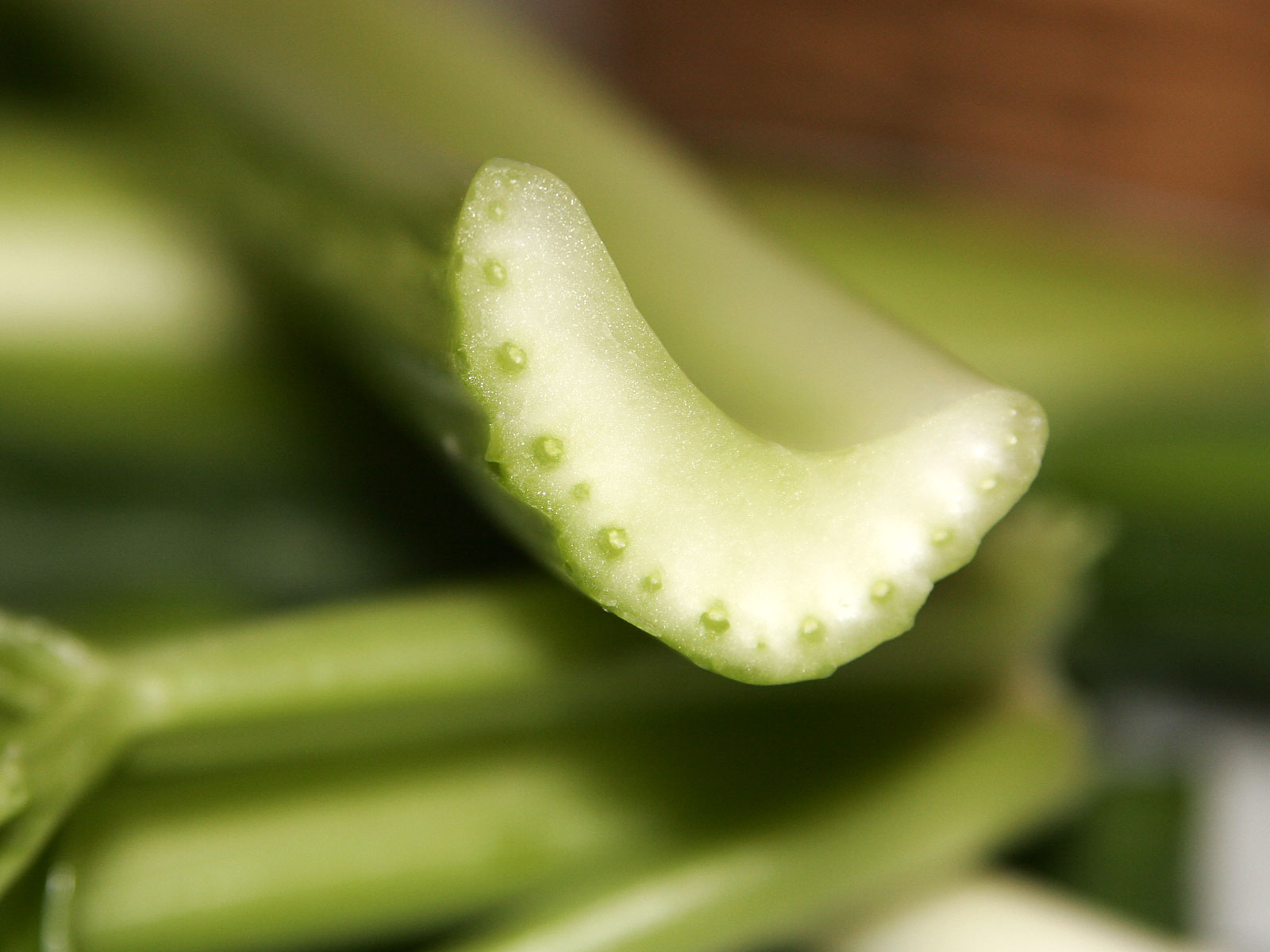
Cross-section of a 'Pascal' celery rib, the petiole

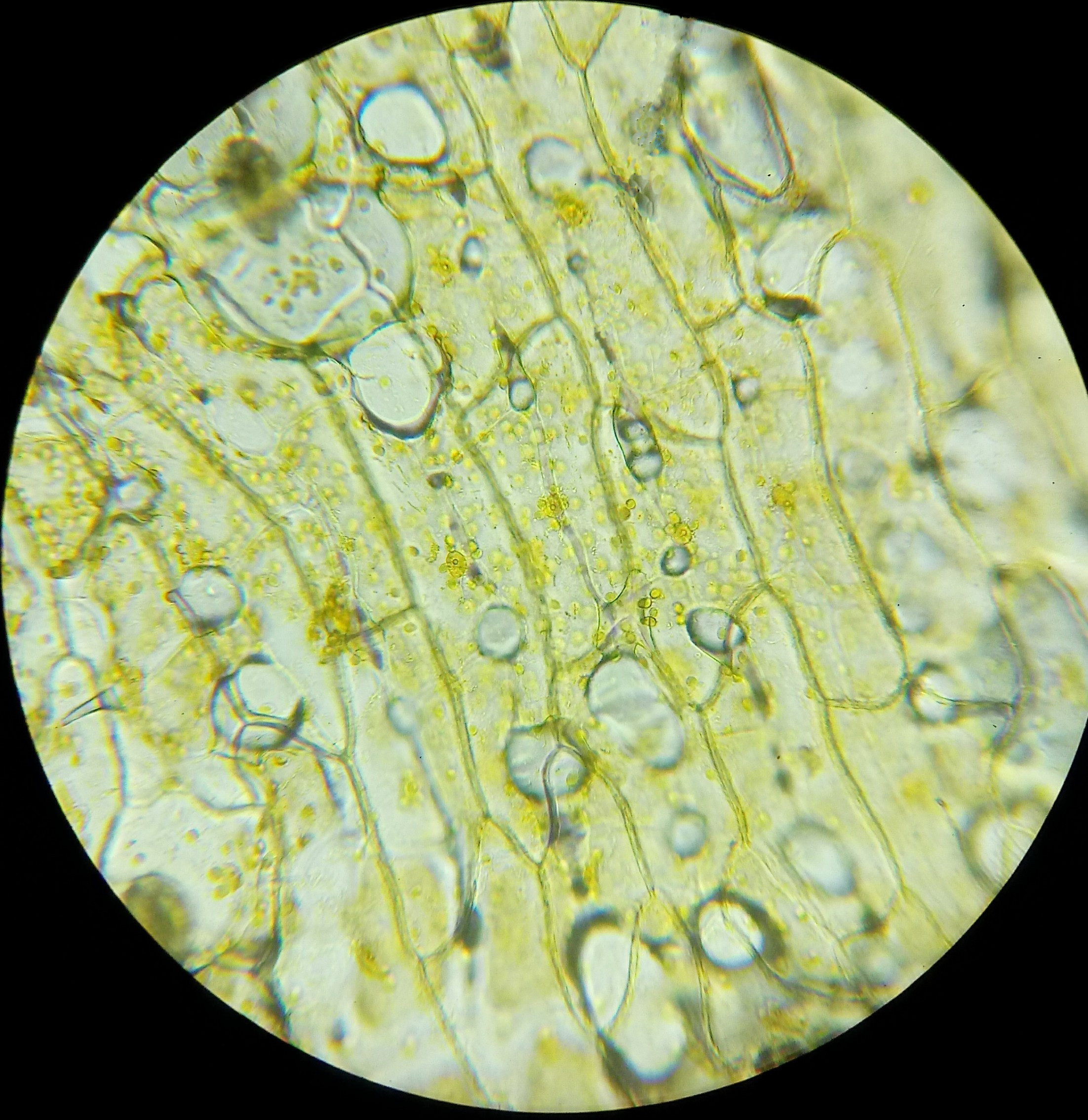
Celery tissue under 400× magnification

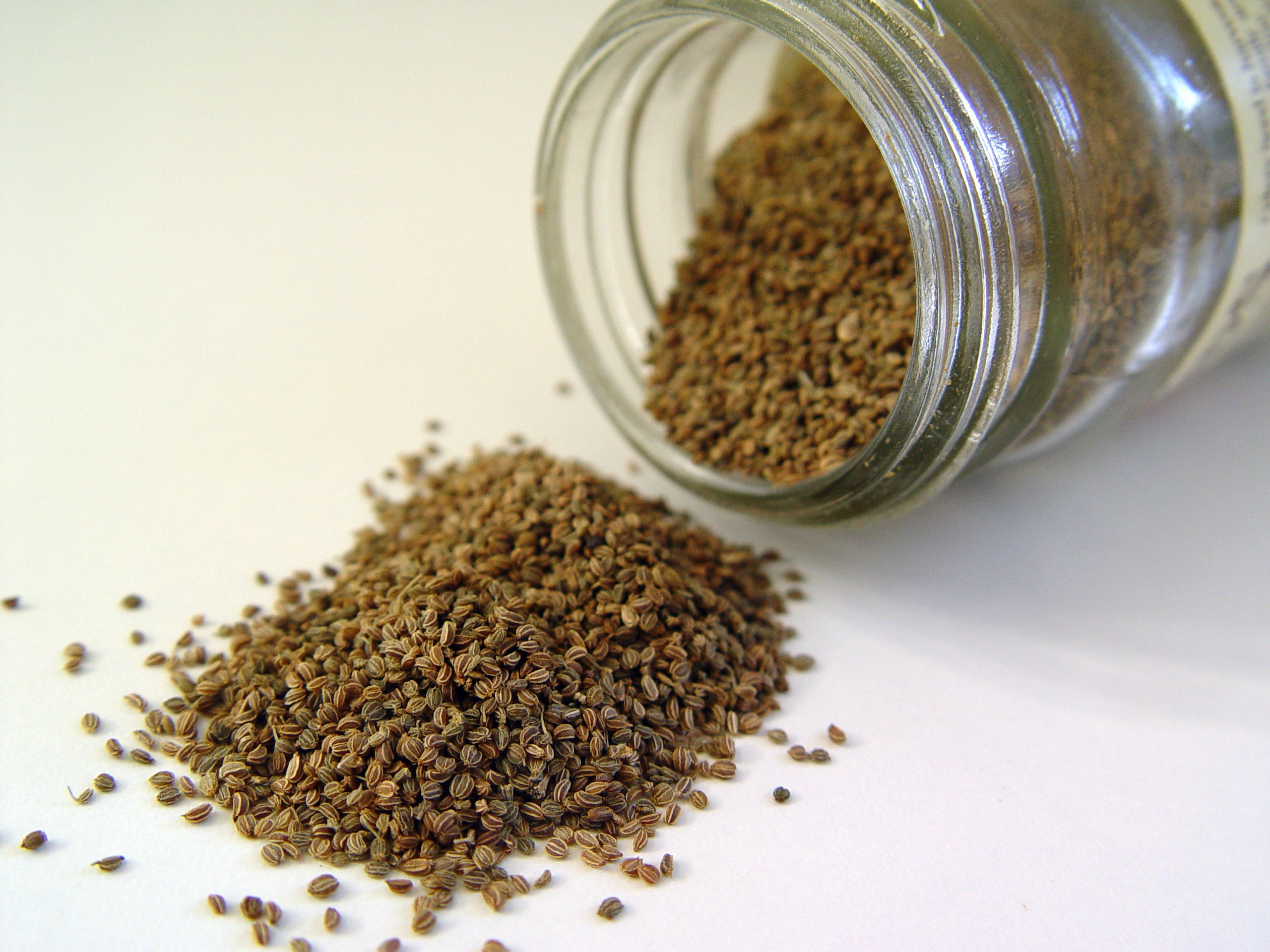
Celery seeds

=== Chemistry ===
The main chemicals responsible for the aroma and taste of celery are butylphthalide and sedanolide.

== Etymology ==
First attested and printed in English as "sellery" by John Evelyn in 1664, the modern English word "celery" derives from the French céleri, in turn from Italian seleri, the plural of selero, which comes from Late Latin selinon, the latinisation of the Ancient Greek: σέλινον, romanized: selinon, "celery". The earliest-attested form of the word is the Mycenaean Greek se-ri-no, written in Linear B syllabic script.

== Taxonomy ==
The species Apium graveolens was described by Carl Linnaeus in Volume One of his Species Plantarum in 1753. Cultivated celery has been called Apium graveolens var. dulce or Apium graveolens Dulce Group.

== Cultivation ==
The plants are raised from seed, sown either in a hot bed or in the open garden according to the season of the year, and, after one or two thinnings and transplantings, they are, on attaining a height of 15–20 cm (6–8 in), planted out in deep trenches for convenience of blanching, which is effected by earthing up to exclude light from the stems. Development of self-blanching varieties of celery, which do not need to be earthed up, dominate both the commercial and amateur market.

Celery was first grown as a winter and early spring vegetable. It was considered a cleansing traditional medicine to counter the scurvy resulting from a winter diet based on salted meats without fresh produce. By the 19th century, the season for celery in England had been extended, to last from the beginning of September to late in April.

In North America, commercial production of celery is dominated by the cultivar called 'Pascal' celery. Gardeners can grow a range of cultivars, many of which differ from the wild species, mainly in having stouter leaf stems. They are ranged under two classes, white and red. The stalks grow in tight, straight, parallel bunches, and are typically marketed fresh that way. They are sold without roots and only a small amount of green leaf remaining.

The stalks can be eaten raw, or as an ingredient in salads, or as a flavouring in soups, stews, and pot roasts.

=== Harvesting and storage ===
Harvesting occurs when the average size of celery in a field is marketable; due to extremely uniform crop growth, fields are harvested only once. The petioles and leaves are removed and harvested; celery is packed by size and quality (determined by colour, shape, straightness and thickness of petiole, stalk and midrib length and absence of disease, cracks, splits, insect damage and rot). During commercial harvesting, celery is packaged into cartons which contain between 36 and 48 stalks and weigh up to 27 kg (60 lb). Under optimal conditions, celery can be stored for up to seven weeks from 0–2 °C (32–36 °F). Inner stalks may continue growing if kept at temperatures above 0 °C (32 °F). Shelf life can be extended by packaging celery in anti-fogging, micro-perforated shrink wrap. Freshly cut petioles of celery are prone to decay, which can be prevented or reduced through the use of sharp blades during processing, gentle handling, and proper sanitation.

Celery stalk may be preserved through pickling by first removing the leaves, then boiling the stalks in water before finally adding vinegar, salt, and vegetable oil.

==== Sulfites ====
In the past, restaurants used to store celery in a container of water with powdered vegetable preservative, but it was found that the sulfites in the preservative caused allergic reactions in some people. In 1986, the U.S. Food and Drug Administration banned the use of sulfites on fruits and vegetables intended to be eaten raw.

== Allergic reactions ==
Celery is among a large group of foods that may provoke allergic reactions; for people with celery allergy, exposure can cause potentially fatal anaphylactic shock. Cases of allergic reaction to ingestion of celery root have also been reported in pollen-sensitive individuals resulting in gastrointestinal disorders and other symptoms, although in most cases, celery sensitivity is not considered clinically significant. In the European Union and the United Kingdom, foods that contain or may contain celery, even in trace amounts, must be clearly marked.

The Apium graveolens plant has an OPALS allergy scale rating of 4 out of 10, indicating moderate potential to cause allergic reactions, exacerbated by over-use of the same plant throughout a garden. Celery has caused skin rashes and cross-reactions with carrots and ragweed.

Celery, raw (Apium graveolens)
Nutritional value per 100 g (3.5 oz)
- Energy: 57 kJ (14 kcal)
- Carbohydrates: 2.97 g (including fibre)
- Starch: 0.00 g
- Sugars: 1.34 g
- Dietary fibre: 1.6 g
- Fat: 0.17 g
- Saturated: 0.042 g
- Monounsaturated: 0.032 g
- Polyunsaturated: 0.079 g
- Protein: 0.69 g
Vitamins and minerals
Vitamins	Quantity %DV^{†}
Vitamin A equiv.	2% 22 μg
Thiamine (B1)	2% 0.021 mg
Riboflavin (B2)	4% 0.057 mg
Niacin (B3)	2% 0.320 mg
Pantothenic acid (B5)	5% 0.246 mg
Vitamin B6	4% 0.074 mg
Folate (B9)	9% 36 μg
Vitamin B12	0% 0.00 μg
Choline	1% 6.1 mg
Vitamin C	3% 3.1 mg
Vitamin D	0% 0 IU
Vitamin E	2% 0.27 mg
Vitamin K	24% 29.3 μg
Minerals	Quantity %DV^{†}
Calcium	3% 40 mg
Copper	4% 0.035 mg
Iron	1% 0.20 mg
Magnesium	3% 11 mg
Manganese	4% 0.103 mg
Phosphorus	2% 24 mg
Potassium	9% 260 mg
Selenium	1% 0.4 μg
Sodium	3% 80 mg
Zinc	1% 0.13 mg
- Other constituents: Quantity
- Water: 95.43 g
- Link to USDA Database entry
- ^{†}Percentages estimated using US recommendations for adults, except for potassium, which is estimated based on expert recommendation from the National Academies.

== Uses ==
=== Nutrition ===
Raw celery is 95% water, 3% carbohydrates, 0.7% protein, and contains negligible fat. A reference amount of 100 grams (3.5 oz) provides 14 calories of food energy and is a rich source of vitamin K, providing 24% of the Daily Value, with no other micronutrients in significant content.

=== Culinary ===
Celery is eaten around the world as a vegetable. In North America and Europe the crisp petiole (leaf stalk) is used. The leaves are strongly flavoured and are used less often, either as a flavouring in soups and stews or as a dried herb. Celery, onions, and bell peppers are the "holy trinity" of Louisiana Creole and Cajun cuisine. Celery, onions, and carrots make up the French mirepoix, often used as a base for sauces and soups. In Italian cuisine, chopped onions, carrots, and celery are slowly cooked in olive oil to make soffritto, which is used as a base for many dishes. Celery is also commonly used in many soups. It is used in the Iranian stew khoresh karafs.

==== Leaves ====
Celery leaves are frequently used in cooking to add a mild spicy flavour to foods, similar to, but milder than black pepper. Celery leaves are suitable dried and sprinkled on baked, fried or roasted fish or meats, or as part of a blend of fresh seasonings suitable for use in soups and stews. They may also be eaten raw, mixed into a salad or as a garnish.

==== Seeds ====
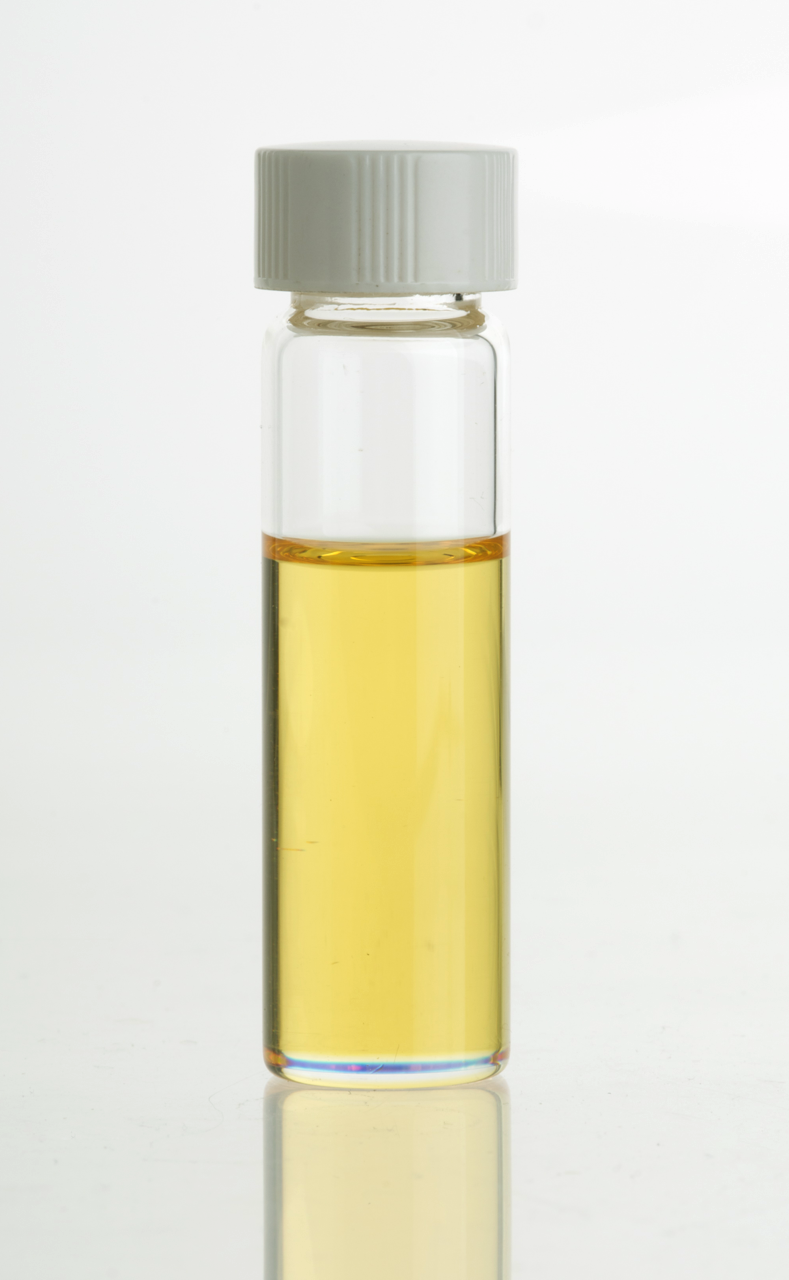
Celery seed essential oil

In temperate countries, celery is also grown for its seeds. Actually very small fruit, these "seeds" yield a valuable essential oil that is used in the perfume industry. The oil contains the chemical compound apiole. Celery seeds can be used as flavouring or spice, either as whole seeds or ground.

Celery seeds are used to flavor Dr. Browns Cel-ray soda, which was first produced in 1868 in New York and frequently appears in pop culture.

==== Celery salt ====
Celery seeds can be ground and mixed with salt to produce celery salt. Celery salt can be made from an extract of the roots or by using dried leaves. Celery salt is used as a seasoning, in cocktails (commonly to enhance the flavour of Bloody Mary cocktails), on the Chicago-style hot dog, and in Old Bay Seasoning. Similarly, combinations of celery powder and salt are used to flavour and preserve cured pork and other processed meats as an alternative to industrial curing salt. The naturally occurring nitrates in celery work synergistically with the added salt to cure food.

==== Celery juice ====
In 2019, a trend of drinking celery juice was reported in the United States, based on "detoxification". The claims have no scientific basis, but the trend caused a sizable spike in celery prices. Celery juice contains less fiber and higher concentrations of oxalates than raw, whole celery.

==== Garnish ====
Celery stalks are a common garnish for Bloody Marys, caesars, and other cocktails. With food celery accompanies buffalo wings and similar dishes.

== In culture ==
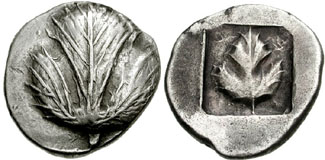
Selinunte didrachm coin bearing a selinon (celery) leaf, c. 515–470 BCE

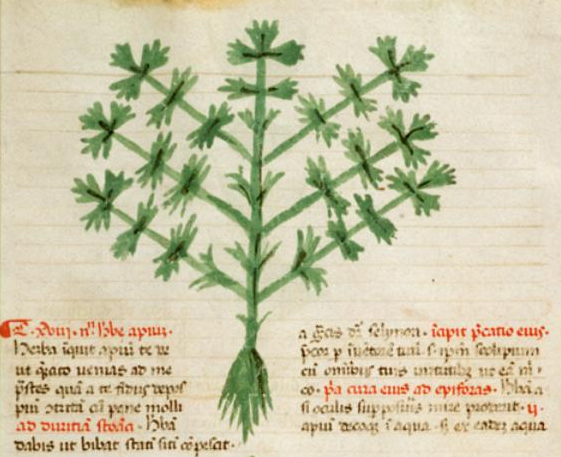
Apium illustration from Barbarus Apuleius' Herbarium, c. 1400 CE

Daniel Zohary and Maria Hopf note that celery leaves and inflorescences were part of the garlands found in the tomb of pharaoh Tutankhamun (died 1323 BCE), and celery mericarps dated to the seventh century BCE were recovered in the Heraion of Samos. They note that, because A. graveolens grows wild in these areas, it is difficult to determine whether the discovered remains represent wild or cultivated forms. Only by classical antiquity is it thought that celery was cultivated.

M. Fragiska mentions an archeological find of celery dating to the 9th century BCE, at Kastanas; however, the literary evidence for ancient Greece is far more abundant. In Homer's Iliad, the horses of the Myrmidons graze on wild celery that grows in the marshes of Troy, and in Odyssey, there is mention of the meadows of violet and wild celery surrounding Calypso's Cave.

In the Capitulary of Charlemagne, compiled c. 800, apium appears, as does olisatum, or alexanders, among folk medicinal herbs and vegetables the Frankish emperor desired to see grown. At some later point in medieval Europe, celery displaced alexanders.

The name "celery" retraces the plant's route of successive adoption in European cooking, as the English "celery" (1664) is derived from the French céleri coming from the Lombard term, seleri, from the Latin selinon, borrowed from Greek.

Celery's late arrival in the English kitchen is an end-product of the long tradition of seed selection needed to reduce the sap's bitterness and increase its sugars. By 1699, John Evelyn could recommend it in his Acetaria. A Discourse of Sallets: "Sellery, apium Italicum, (and of the Petroseline Family) was formerly a stranger with us (nor very long since in Italy) is a hot and more generous sort of Macedonian Persley or Smallage... and for its high and grateful Taste is ever plac'd in the middle of the Grand Sallet, at our Great Men's tables, and Praetors feasts, as the Grace of the whole Board".

Celery makes a minor appearance in colonial American gardens; its culinary limitations are reflected in the observation by the author of A Treatise on Gardening, by a Citizen of Virginia that it is "one of the species of parsley". Its first extended treatment in print was in Bernard M'Mahon's American Gardener's Calendar (1806).

After the mid-19th century, continued selections for refined crisp texture and taste brought celery to American tables, where it was served in celery vases to be salted and eaten raw. Celery was so popular in the United States during the 19th and early 20th centuries that the New York Public Library's historical menu archive shows that it was the third-most-popular dish in New York City menus during that time, behind only coffee and tea. There were also many varieties of celery back then that are no longer around because they are difficult to grow and do not ship well.

A chthonian symbol among the ancient Greeks, celery was said to have sprouted from the blood of Kadmilos, father of the Cabeiri, chthonian divinities celebrated in Samothrace, Lemnos, and Thebes. The spicy odor and dark leaf colour encouraged this association with the cult of death. In classical Greece, celery leaves were used as garlands for the dead, and the wreaths of the winners at the Isthmian Games were first made of celery before being replaced by crowns made of pine. According to Pliny the Elder, in Achaea, the garland worn by the winners of the sacred Nemean Games was also made of celery. The Ancient Greek colony of Selinous (Ancient Greek: Σελινοῦς, Selinous), on Sicily, was named after wild parsley that grew abundantly there; Selinountian coins depicted a parsley leaf as the symbol of the city.

== See also ==
- Apium virus Y
- Celery mosaic virus
- Celery powder
- Celery vase
- Liriomyza trifolii – celery leaf miner
- Vallisneria americana – wild celery
- List of vegetables
