= Celery mosaic virus =

Virus classification
- (unranked): Virus
- Realm: Riboviria
- Kingdom: Orthornavirae
- Phylum: Pisuviricota
- Class: Stelpaviricetes
- Order: Patatavirales
- Family: Potyviridae
- Genus: Potyvirus
- Species: Potyvirus apiumtessellati

Synonyms
- Apium virus 1; Western celery mosaic virus (WCeMV); Celery crinkle-leaf virus; Celery ringspot virus; Poison hemlock ringspot virus

Species of virus

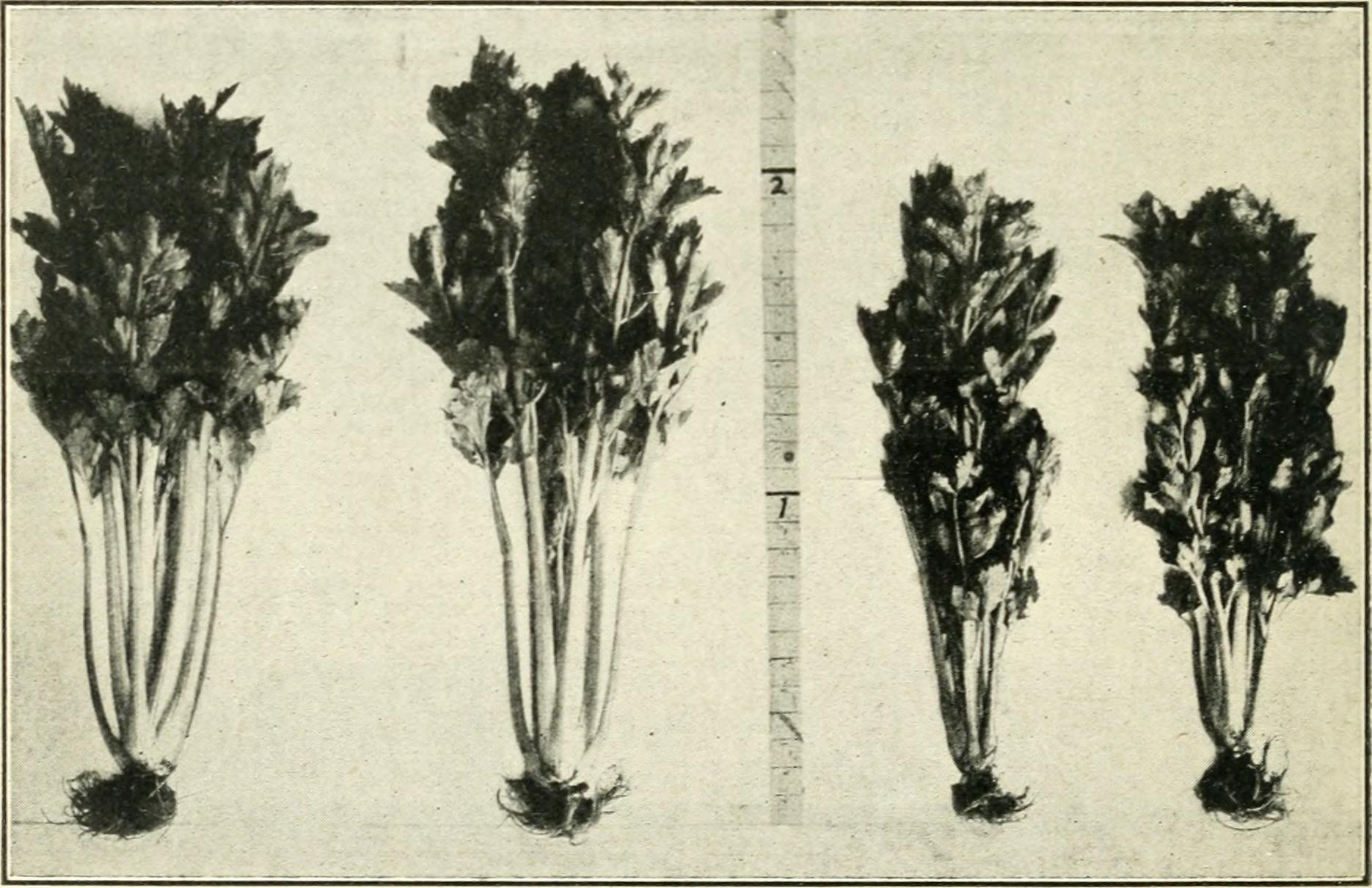
Illustration of uninfected celery (left) compared to celery infected with CeMV (right).

Celery mosaic virus (CeMV) is a plant pathogenic virus in the genus Potyvirus and the family Potyviridae.

In California, mosaic diseases of celery (Apium graveolens) were reported as early as 1922. After some time, it became clear that there were at least two different viruses causing mosaic diseases with similar symptoms in celery.

These two viruses were first differentiated by host range. One of the viruses had a wide host range and was named Southern celery mosaic. The second had a host range restricted to the family Umbelliferae (Apiaceae) and was called Western celery mosaic. Continued research showed that the Southern mosaic virus was actually an isolate of Cucumber mosaic virus and Western celery mosaic eventually became known simply as Celery mosaic virus.

== Symptoms and host range ==
Symptoms of celery mosaic virus include a distinct mottled pattern on the leaves, distorted leaf growth with exaggerated rosette formation. Some strains of celery mosaic virus cause a "crinkled" pattern to form on the leaves of the plant. Oftentimes, plants infected with celery mosaic virus early in their development do not produce usable crops. Plants infected by the virus late in their development may provide usable crops provided that the crops are harvested quickly after infection.

Celery is the most common host of this virus. As the name implies, this virus causes a mosaic or mottling in the leaves of celery. There can also be malformation of leaflets. In older leaves, chlorotic or necrotic spots may occur and the plants can be stunted.

In addition to celery, this virus has been identified in other important crops in the Apiaceae including carrots (Daucus carota), coriander (Coriandrum sativum), parsley (Petroselinum crispum), parsnip (Pastinaca sativa), and dill (Anethum graveolens). It has also been identified in several weed species in the family Apiaceae, including poison hemlock (Conium maculatum), mock bishopweed (Ptilimnium capillaceum) and wild cherry (Apium leptophyllum).

There is some confusion in the literature as to whether CeMV can infect hosts in the family Chenopodiaceae. In 2002, a paper reporting the results of a survey in Australia found three different but related potyviruses infecting species of the Apiaceae in Australia, CeMV, Carrot virus Y (CarVY), and Apium virus Y (ApVY). Both CarVY and ApVY have been shown to infect one or more species of Chenopodium. The latter reference, reporting ApVY infecting celery in New Zealand, found the plants to be doubly infected with CeMV and ApVY and the authors suggested that CeMV "may mask the presence of ApVY". It is possible that one or both of these viruses have been undetected in mixed infections with CeMV in some past studies. With sequence data now available for both CarVY and ApVY this ambiguity may be cleared up in time.

== Geographic distribution ==
The geographic distribution of this virus is probably worldwide. In North America, besides California (USA), it has been reported in Florida and in Ontario, Canada. In Europe it has been reported in the UK, France, Germany, Italy, the Netherlands and in the former Czechoslovakia. In South America it has been identified in Argentina, Brazil, and Chile. It has also been identified in Japan, Australia and New Zealand.

== Transmission and disease management ==
Celery mosaic, like most potyviruses, is non-persistently transmitted by aphids. This means that the aphid can pick up the virus on its stylet (its mouthparts) and transfer it quickly to the next plant it probes. The virus can also be transmitted mechanically by tools and machinery. At least 26 different aphid species are known to transmit the virus. There is no evidence of seed transmission.

Because chemicals are not effective in treating plant viruses, management of celery mosaic virus focuses on reducing aphid population within colonies of plants. Recommendations for management of celery mosaic virus include planting resistant cultivars, spreading out crops, clearing weeds from crop fields, and treating crops with pesticides. Because celery mosaic virus also affects umbelliferous plants, removal of umbelliferous weeds, like wild celery and wild parsnip, helps to control aphid populations.

Celery grown in fields that have been host free for 2–3 months show greatly reduced risk of exposure to CeMV.

Many studies have shown reduced virus outbreaks and severity in fields treated with reflective mulch which can provide unappealing visual stimuli to infected aphids. Fields treated with this mulch experience reduced infection rates.

== Genome ==
The complete genome of Celery Mosaic Virus was sequenced in 2011. It was found to be 9999 nucleotides in length, encoding for 3181 amino acids in a single large open reading frame, and sharing between 39 and 72% of its sequence identity with other members of the genus Potyvirus, and is most closely related to Apium virus Y. Together, CeMV, Apium virus Y, and Panax virus Y form a distinct clade.
