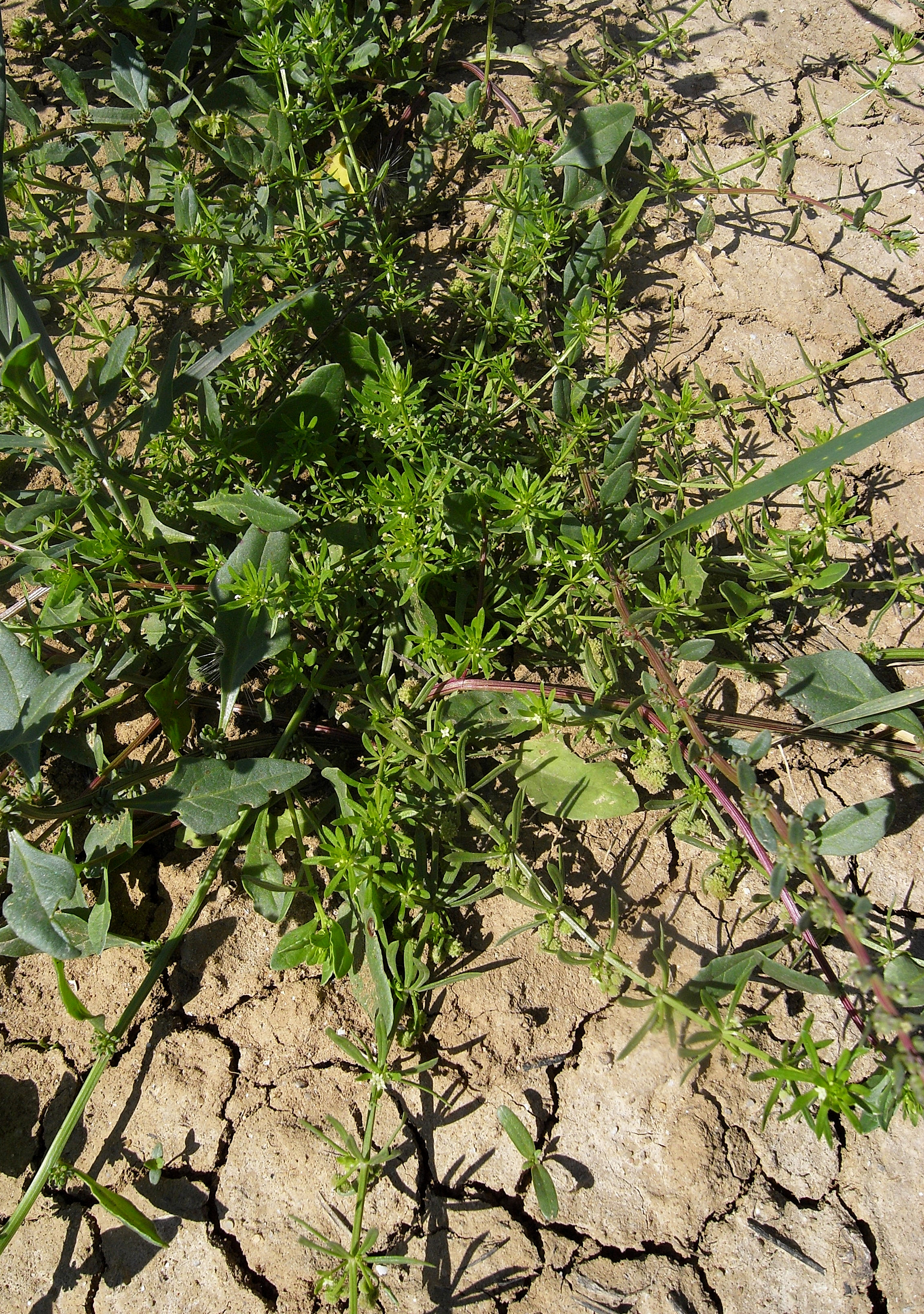
- In Sebkha Kelbia

Scientific classification
- Kingdom: Plantae
- Clade: Embryophytes
- Clade: Tracheophytes
- Clade: Angiosperms
- Clade: Eudicots
- Order: Caryophyllales
- Family: Amaranthaceae
- Genus: Beta
- Species: B. macrocarpa

Binomial name
- Beta macrocarpa Guss.

Synonyms
- Beta bourgaei Coss.

= Beta macrocarpa =

Species of flowering plant

Beta macrocarpa, the large-fruited beet, is a species of flowering plant in the family Amaranthaceae, native to the Canary Islands and the shores of the Mediterranean. It is widely used to study beet necrotic yellow vein virus in an effort to improve the sugar beet.
