= Pipethiaden =

Chemical compound

Clinical data
- ATC code: None

Identifiers
- IUPAC name: 1-Methyl-4-(thieno[2,3-c][2]benzothiepin-4(9H)-ylidene)piperidine
- CAS Number: 15053-99-3
- PubChem CID: 197209
- ChemSpider: 170786
- UNII: 4M164I6E36
- CompTox Dashboard (EPA): DTXSID70164567

Chemical and physical data
- Formula: C_{18}H_{19}NS_{2}
- Molar mass: 313.48 g·mol^{−1}
- 3D model (JSmol): Interactive image
- SMILES: CN1CCC(=C2c3ccccc3CSc4c2ccs4)CC1
- InChI: InChI=InChI=1S/C18H19NS2/c1-19-9-6-13(7-10-19)17-15-5-3-2-4-14(15)12-21-18-16(17)8-11-20-18/h2-5,8,11H,6-7,9-10,12H2,1H3; Key:VZWWTHTUQTYAGH-UHFFFAOYSA-N

Pipethiaden is a benzothiepin-based drug candidate that was at one time studied as a potential preventive to reduce the frequency of recurrent migraine headaches. It also has some activity as an antihistamine and is also an antagonist at the 5-HT_{2A} and 5HT_{2C} receptors.

Synthesis: Review:
