= Butylphthalide =

Names
- Preferred IUPAC name 3-Butyl-2-benzofuran-1(3H)-one
- Other names 3-Butylphthalide; 3-n-Butylphthalide

Identifiers
| CAS Number | 6066-49-5 |
| 3D model (JSmol) | Interactive image |
| Abbreviations | NBP; BuPh |
| ChemSpider | 55293 |
| ECHA InfoCard | 100.025.455 |
| PubChem CID | 61361 |
| UNII | 822Q956KGM |
| CompTox Dashboard (EPA) | DTXSID50863687 |
- InChI: InChI=1S/C12H14O2/c1-2-3-8-11-9-6-4-5-7-10(9)12(13)14-11/h4-7,11H,2-3,8H2,1H3 Key: HJXMNVQARNZTEE-UHFFFAOYSA-N; InChI=1/C12H14O2/c1-2-3-8-11-9-6-4-5-7-10(9)12(13)14-11/h4-7,11H,2-3,8H2,1H3 Key: HJXMNVQARNZTEE-UHFFFAOYAC
- SMILES: O=C1OC(c2ccccc12)CCCC

Properties
| Chemical formula | C_{12}H_{14}O_{2} |
| Molar mass | 190.242 g·mol^{−1} |
| Appearance | clear oily liquid |

Related compounds
| Related compounds | Phthalide |
- Except where otherwise noted, data are given for materials in their standard state (at 25 °C [77 °F], 100 kPa). Infobox references

Butylphthalide (3-n-butylphthalide or NBP) is one of the chemical constituents in celery oil, along with sedanolide, which is primarily responsible for the aroma and taste of celery.

Studies in animal models suggest that butylphthalide may be useful for the treatment of hypertension and may have neuroprotective effects. In 2002, NBP was approved in China for the treatment of cerebral ischemia.

NBP undergoes extensive metabolism in humans. The major metabolites in human plasma were 3-OH-NBP, 10-OH-NBP, 10-CO-NBP, 11-COOH-NBP. The AUC of metabolites was much larger than that of NBP.

Minor side effects were observed in preclinical and clinical studies. The minor bioactivation pathway of NBP was proved to be mediated via sulfation of 3-OH-NBP.
