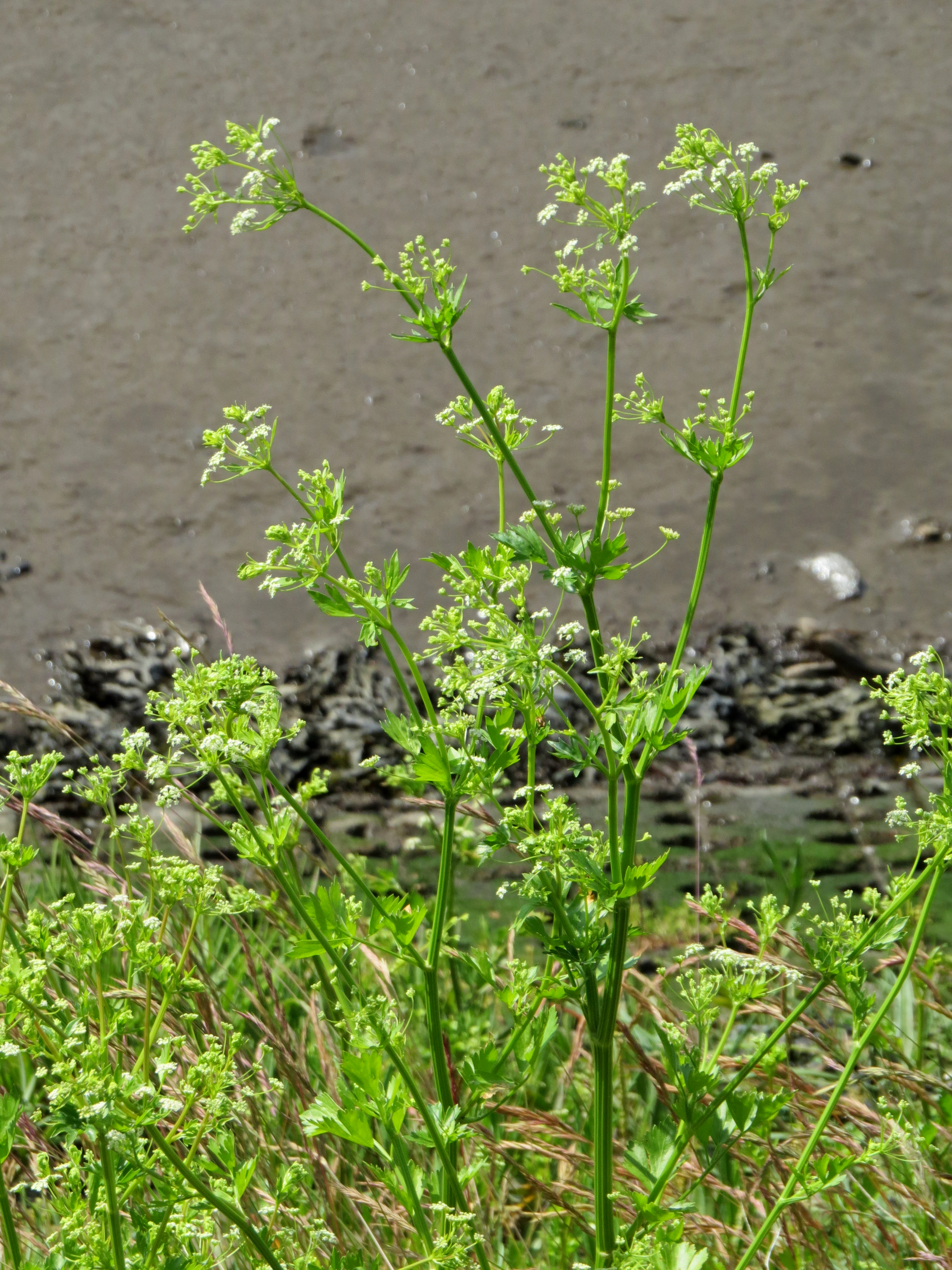
- Growing wild on the tidal banks of the Tyne in Northumberland

Scientific classification
- Kingdom: Plantae
- Clade: Tracheophytes
- Clade: Angiosperms
- Clade: Eudicots
- Clade: Asterids
- Order: Apiales
- Family: Apiaceae
- Genus: Apium
- Species: A. graveolens

Binomial name
- Apium graveolens L.

Synonyms
- List: Apium australe var. latisectum H.Wolff; Apium celleri Gaertn.; Apium decumbens Eckl. & Zeyh.; Apium dulce Mill.; Apium graveolens convar. dulce (Mill.) Alef.; Apium graveolens convar. rapaceum (Mill.) Alef.; Apium graveolens subsp. butronense (D.Gómez & G.Monts.) Aizpuru; Apium graveolens subsp. dulce (Mill.) Schübl. & G.Martens; Apium graveolens subsp. rapaceum (Mill.) P.D.Sell; Apium graveolens subsp. rapaceum (Mill.) Schübl. & G.Martens; Apium graveolens var. album Alef.; Apium graveolens var. aromaticum Alef.; Apium graveolens var. bashmense Hosni; Apium graveolens var. butronense D.Gómez & G.Monts.; Apium graveolens var. crispum Nois.; Apium graveolens var. dulce (Mill.) Poir.; Apium graveolens var. erfurtense Alef.; Apium graveolens var. humile Alef.; Apium graveolens var. juglandinum Alef.; Apium graveolens var. laeve Alef.; Apium graveolens var. latifolium Nois.; Apium graveolens var. lusitanicum (Mill.) DC.; Apium graveolens var. maritimum Dumort.; Apium graveolens var. praecox Alef.; Apium graveolens var. rapaceum (Mill.) DC.; Apium graveolens var. rapaceum (Mill.) Poir.; Apium graveolens var. rubrum Alef.; Apium graveolens var. sativum Gaudin, nom. superfl.; Apium graveolens var. secalinum Alef.; Apium graveolens var. silvestre Alef.; Apium graveolens var. tuberosum Nois.; Apium graveolens var. variegatum Nois.; Apium graveolens var. venosum Alef.; Apium graveolens var. violaceum Alef.; Apium graveolens var. vulgare Nois.; Apium integrilobum Hayata; Apium lobatum Gilib., opus utique oppr.; Apium lusitanicum Mill.; Apium maritimum Salisb.; Apium palustre Thore; Apium rapaceum Mill.; Apium vulgare Bubani; Carum graveolens (L.) Koso-Pol.; Celeri graveolens (L.) Britton; Helosciadium graveolens (L.) Rojas Acosta; Helosciadium ruta DC.; Helosciadium rutaceum St.-Lag.; Selinum graveolens (L.) E.H.L.Krause, nom. illeg.; Seseli graveolens (L.) Scop.; Sison ruta Burm.f.; Sison trifidum Burm. ex DC., not validly publ.; Sium apium Roth; Sium graveolens (L.) Vest; Smyrnium laterale Thunb.

= Apium graveolens =

Species of plant

Apium graveolens, commonly known as celery, is an Old World species of flowering plant in the family Apiaceae. It was first described by Carl Linnaeus in 1753.

The species is widely naturalised outside of its natural range and is used as a vegetable; modern cultivars have been selected for their leaf stalks (celery), a large bulb-like hypocotyl (celeriac), and their leaves (leaf celery).

== Description ==
Apium graveolens is a stout biennial or monocarpic perennial herb, producing flowers and seeds only once, during its second or a later year. It grows up to 1 m (3 ft) tall, with all parts of the plant having a strong celery odour. The stems are solid with conspicuous grooves on the surface (sulcate). The leaves are bright green to yellowish-green, 1- to 2-pinnate with leaflets that are variously shaped, often rhomboid, up to 6 cm (2 1/2 in) long and 4 cm (1 1/2 in) broad.

The flowers are produced in umbels, mostly with short peduncles, with four to twelve rays. The individual flowers are creamy-white to greenish-white, 2–3 mm (3/32–1/8 in) across. The fruit is a schizocarp, broadly ovoid to globose, 1–1.5 mm (3/64–1/16 in) long and wide.

== Taxonomy ==
The species Apium graveolens was first described by Carl Linnaeus in 1753. A large number of varieties have been described, none of which are accepted by Plants of the World Online as of May 2024. It has been selected as the type species of the genus Apium, and through that, of the family Apiaceae and the order Apiales.

The cultivar groups have often been given botanical variety names, but more accurately cultivar group names under the International Code of Nomenclature for Cultivated Plants. Thus cultivated celery was often called Apium graveolens var. dulce, but as cultivated plants, Apium graveolens Dulce Group.

Other vernacular names have been used, including "smallage", which is mostly archaic but still in occasional use, primarily outside of the species' native range.

== Distribution and habitat ==
Wild celery is native to much of Eurasia, ranging from Ireland in the west, through Europe north to Scotland, Denmark and Poland, and east to the Caucasus and Central Asia, and as far as the western Himalayas, and also through Macaronesia and North Africa to West Asia and the Arabian Peninsula. It is widely naturalised outside this range, including in Scandinavia, North and South America, Africa, India, central, eastern and southern Asia, and New Zealand. The cultivar groups may also be naturalised.

It is a plant of damp places, usually near the coast where the soil is salty, typically on the brackish reaches of tidal rivers, ditch and dyke margins, saltmarshes, and sea walls. North of the Alps, wild celery is found only in the foothill zone on soils with some salt content.

== Uses ==
Wild celery was used for its medical properties and as a condiment by the Ancient Egyptians, Greeks and Romans, and also in China. The species was later developed as a vegetable, particularly in Italy from the 16th century. Modern cultivars have been selected for different uses, falling into three groups according to the part that is mainly eaten:

- Celery (Apium graveolens Dulce Group; syn. Apium graveolens var. dulce), is used for its leaf stalks, which may be eaten raw or cooked.
- Celeriac (Apium graveolens Rapaceum Group; syn. Apium graveolens var. rapaceum), is used for its swollen bulb-like hypocotyl.
- Leaf celery, smallage or parcel (Apium graveolens Secalinum Group; syn. Apium graveolens var. secalinum), has larger leaves; both the leaves and stems are eaten.
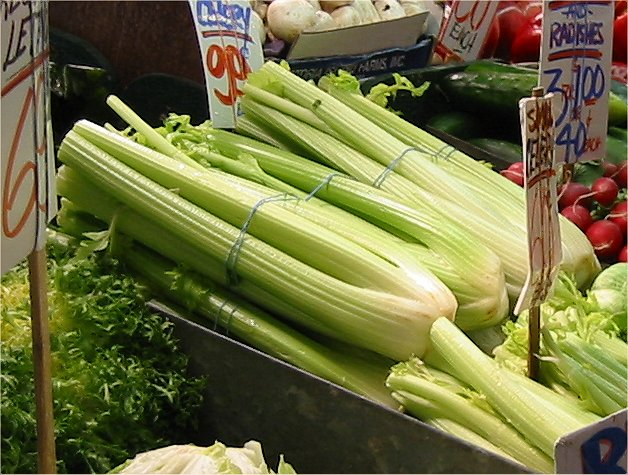
Celery

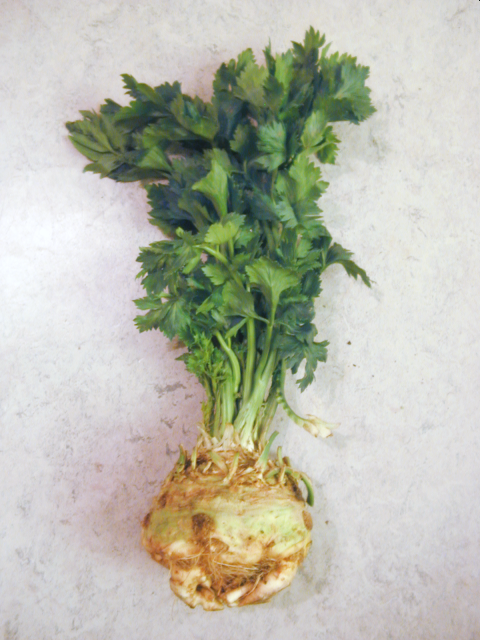
Celeriac

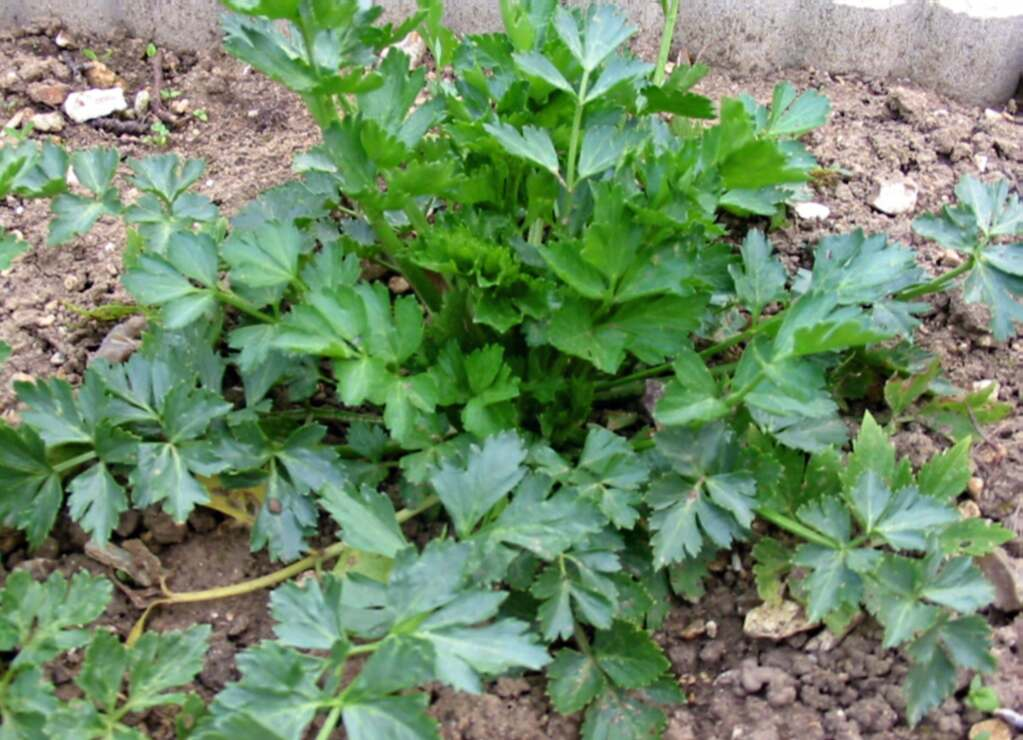
Leaf celery
