= Beet necrotic yellow vein virus =

Virus classification
- (unranked): Virus
- Realm: Riboviria
- Kingdom: Orthornavirae
- Phylum: Kitrinoviricota
- Class: Alsuviricetes
- Order: Hepelivirales
- Family: Benyviridae
- Genus: Benyvirus
- Species: Benyvirus necrobetae

Synonyms
- Beet necrotic yellow vein virus; (possibly) Beet yellow vein virus

Species of virus

Beet necrotic yellow vein virus (BNYVV) is a plant virus, transmitted by the plasmodiophorid Polymyxa betae. The BNYVV is a member of the genus Benyvirus and is responsible for rhizomania, a disease of sugar beet (Rhizo: root; Mania: madness) that causes proliferation of thin rootlets, and leads to a smaller tap root with reduced sugar content. Infected plants are less able to take up water, and wilting can be observed during the warm period of the year. If the infection spreads to the whole plant, vein yellowing, necrosis and yellow spots appear on the leaves, giving the virus its name.

== Hosts and symptoms ==
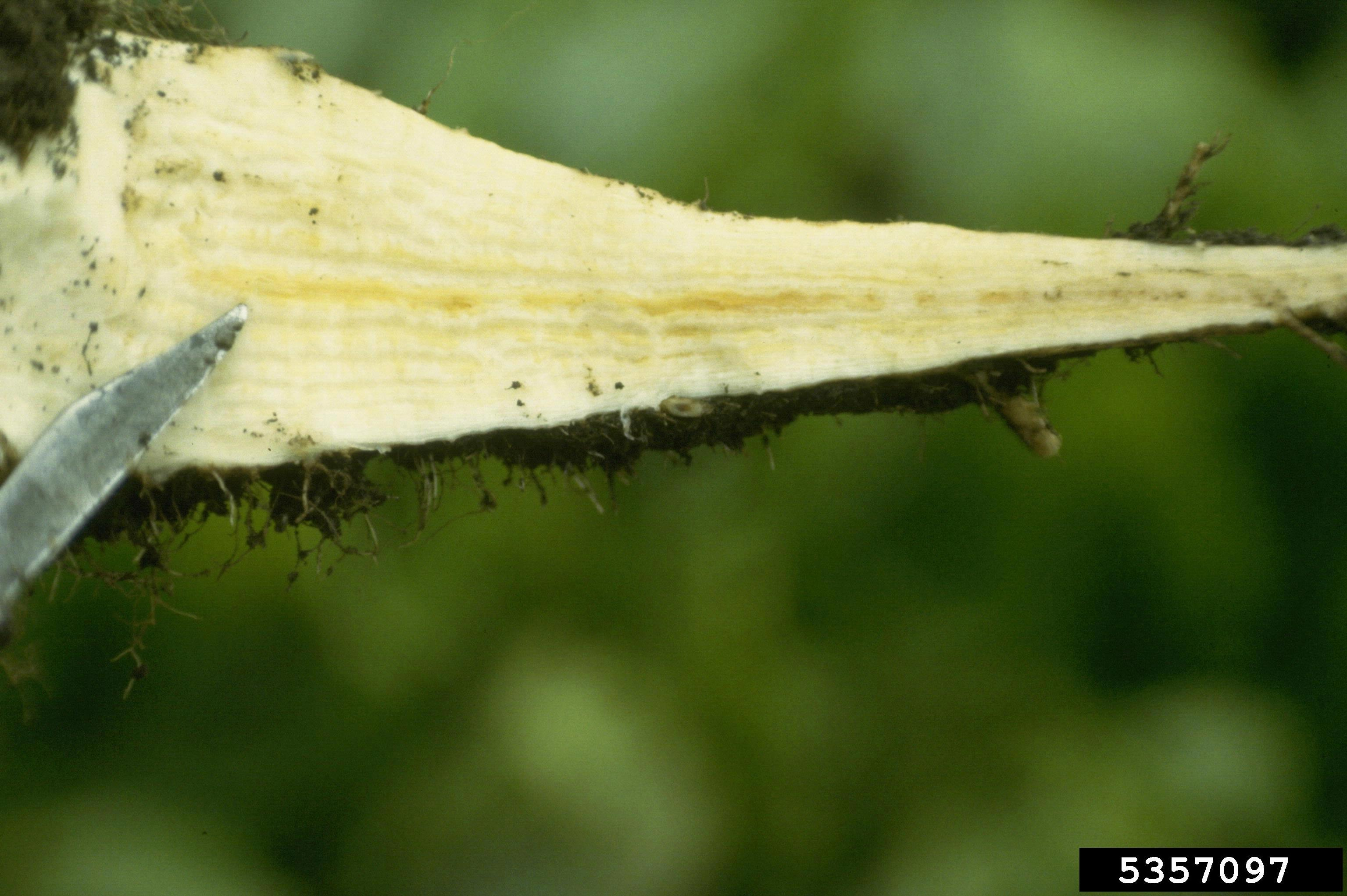
In this sliced open root, discoloration and the swelling of the crown due to rhizomania can be seen. The swelling of the crown is often referred to as "wine glass swelling" due to the shape resembling a wine glass.

BNYVV Infects all of the following species: Beta vulgaris (beetroot), Beta vulgaris var. cicla, Beta vulgaris var. rubra, Beta vulgaris var. saccharifera (sugarbeet), Chamomilla recutita (common chamomile), Chenopodium (Goosefoot), Chenopodium quinoa (quinoa), Cichorium intybus (chicory), Cirsium arvense (creeping thistle), Convolvulus arvensis (bindweed), Datura stramonium (jimsonweed), Descurainia sophia (flixweed), Heliotropium europaeum (common heliotrope), Nicotiana tabacum (tobacco), Plantago major (broad-leaved plantain), Raphanus raphanistrum (wild radish), Spinacia oleracea (spinach), Tetragonia tetragonioides (New Zealand spinach), Tribulus terrestris (puncture vine), Veronica hederifolia and Xanthium strumarium (common cocklebur). The plants that suffer infections from BNYVV in the most abundance are all the subspecies of Beta Vulgaris, specifically Beta vulgaris var. saccharifera (sugar beet), and Spinacia oleracea (spinach).

In Beta vulgaria var. saccharifera (sugar beet), symptoms are most often local in the roots and leaves, but can be found systemically on rare occasions. Symptoms are seen differently depending on when the infection occurs in the plant. In early life stages and early growing season, a diseases called rhizomania is caused as a result of the virus. Rhizomania is the growth of fine, hairy secondary roots which are dead and thus prevent the proper uptake of water. Because of rhizomania, the sugar beet is subject to severe infection where the entire plant is stunted, leaves are wilted, and death can occur. Due to the severity of an early onset infection, the most common symptom of BNYVV, yellow mosaic on the leaves, is rarely seen as the plant often dies before the virus can spread. For midseason and less severe infections, rhizomania results in the storage root rotting and constricting, causing the root to swell near the crown. In this case, rhizomania doesn't cause the plant to die which allows the virus is able to make its way to the leaves resulting in yellow-pale discoloration, proliferation, and upright growth. In late season infections, both roots and leaves appear asymptomatic.

Spinacia oleracea (spinach) can also be infected by the same strand of BNYVV. For this plant, complete infection of the plant can occur in as little as four weeks causing yellow-green vein clearing on young leaves, stiff and/or crinkled leaves, necrosis, stunting, wilting, and possibly death. Unlike the sugar beet plant, systemic infection is almost always seen in spinach due to easy transmission through the plants roots. Recent studies have indicated a link between the BvGLYR1 gene and virus accumulation in BNYVV infection. Plants expressing the BvGLYR1 gene exhibited significantly higher viral titers at lower temperatures (22°C) when compared to controls, highlighting a temperature-sensitive mechanism. At 30°C, however, this effect was greatly diminished, suggesting temperature-dependent gene function in relation to BNYVV infection.

== Environment ==
BNYVV was first discovered in Japan during the 1950s and in Italy circa 1959. In the following two decades, the virus had spread to central, eastern, and southern Europe. Currently, the virus is found in 22 European countries, six Asian countries, and select states of the U.S.A. (Idaho, Nebraska, New Mexico, Texas, Washington, Wyoming).

Because BNYVV is a virus, it can't move on its own thus making a vector or other modes of transportation a necessity for it to infect multiple hosts. The most common way for the virus to be dispersed is Polymyxa betae, a plasmodiophoromycete fungal-like vector. The important aspect of P. betae is that it doesn't infect the plant itself, rather it functions as a storage unit for the BNYVV virus. In P. betae, the virus can lay dormant for over ten years making it easily dispersed in areas with much rain and farms with irrigation. Two other main ways that BNYVV is spread are infected plant roots and infected beet stecklings.

Focusing on P. betae, conditions that favor this vector have high correlation with amount of disease seen in plants. In order for P. betae to release the virus, it requires a high soil moisture. This can be a result from excessive rainfall, excessive irrigation, and/or poor drainage systems which all promote severe cases of the disease. Along with soil moisture, soil quality also plays a role in disease severity. Poor soil structure is a major factor in causing severe cases of the BNYVV making crop rotation and tilling a necessity to minimize the chance of a severe outbreak. Temperature wise, P. betae thrives in warmer soil temperatures (around 25 degrees Celsius) which makes the ideal planting time fall in spring or early summer at the latest.

== Management ==
Because BNYVV can't be transmitted via seed or pollen, it uses Polymyxa betae to disperse via its resting spores called cystosori. The cystosori can be found in soil or in dried plant roots where they can remain dormant for more than 10 years making the elimination of this virus very difficult. Modeling the spread of BNYV allows roguing of infected plants on the basis of surveillance. Stacy et al 2004 provides a model of BNYV in the United Kingdom and management strategies to be implemented.

The most important form of management for BNYVV is water management. Because P. betae thrives in moist conditions, heavy rain and irrigation creating high soil moisture cause the most severe cases of disease inoculation. This makes water management crucial at the beginning of the growing season to the point where cultivators are encouraged to restrain from any type of irrigation for up to six weeks after first germination of the plant. Irrigation can also create runoff which can transfer infectious P. betae to other healthy fields that will result in destruction of that field as well which makes water runoff management just as important as irrigation management.

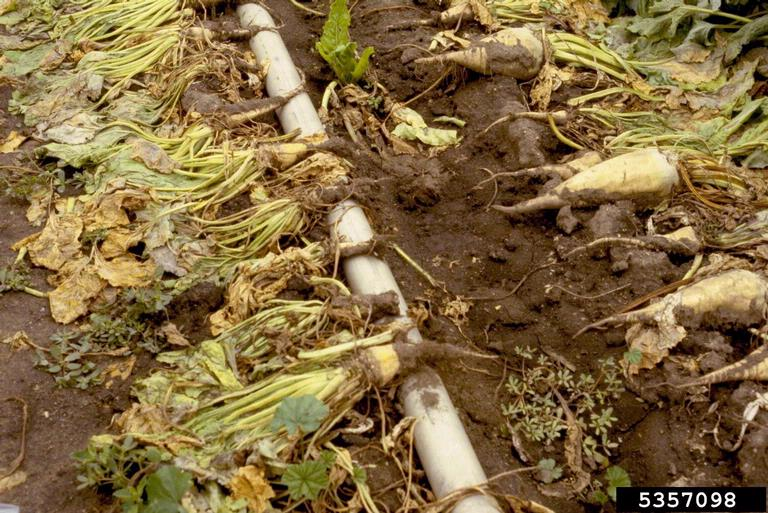
Non-resistant beets (left) vs resistant beets (right) exposed to the BNYV virus

Another form of dispersal is a result of human interactions. The resting spores of P. betae located in the soil can be picked up by farm contaminated machinery/tools, human movement, and livestock movement making the identification of infected fields very important. This infected soil can also be found in manure which can infect fields by using it as a fertilizer. Currently, treating infected soil is not only very difficult, but also very expensive. Some chemical use and fumigation has been found to only be somewhat effective, but the cost of either grossly outweighs the potential benefit. This makes avoiding cross contamination crucial for disease management. Infected fields should be isolated as much as possible due to the spread of the pathogen being possible via only small amounts of soil. Due to P. betae being very difficult to kill, if avoiding contaminated soil is not possible than the use of disposable or rubber footwear is advised in order to ensure proper cleaning. Cleaning of footwear and machinery should be done at the infected site due to the little amount of pathogen it takes to start a widespread infection.

Due to the difficulty of managing P. betae, the most promising form of management is the pursuit of resistant crops. There has been a focus on two genes in particular, Rz1 from B. vulgaris spp. vulgaris and Rz2 from B. vulgaris spp. maritima. These genes focus on restricting the translocation and multiplication of the virus in the roots, but don't prevent infection all together. Resistance is also helpful in delaying and limiting the buildup of initial inoculum in the soil.
