= Celeriac =

Variety of plant

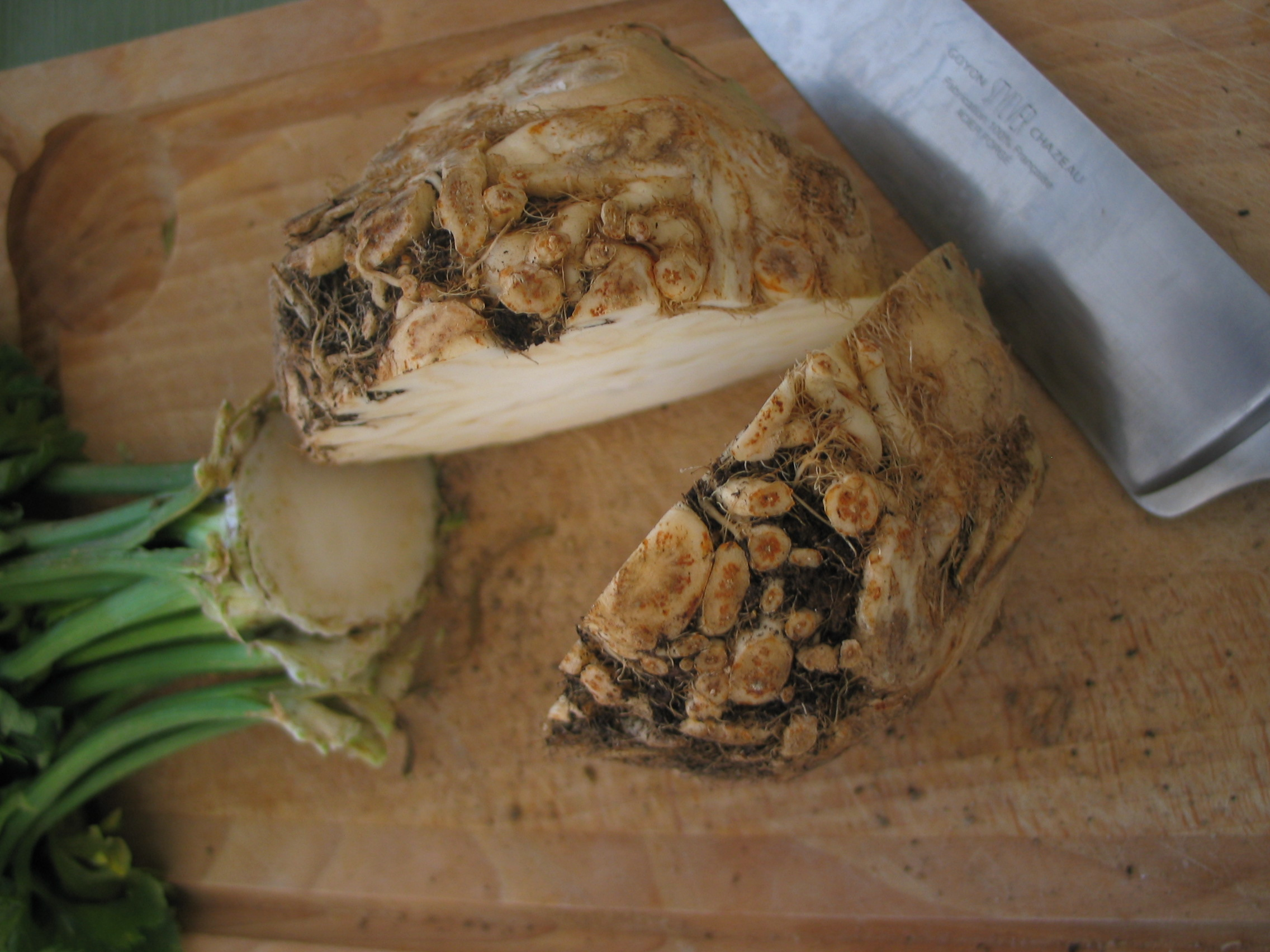
- A celeriac hypocotyl sliced in half, and with the greens removed
- Genus: Apium
- Species: Apium graveolens
- Cultivar group: Rapaceum Group or Celeriac Group
- Cultivar group members: Bergers White Ball; Diamant; Giant Prague; Goliath; Ibis; Kojak; Monarch; Monet F1; Prinz; Snow White

Celeriac (Apium graveolens Rapaceum Group, synonyms Apium graveolens Celeriac Group and Apium graveolens var. rapaceum), also called celery root, knob celery, and turnip-rooted celery (although it is not a close relative of the turnip), is a group of cultivars of Apium graveolens cultivated for their edible bulb-like hypocotyl, and shoots.

Celeriac is widely cultivated in the Mediterranean Basin and in Northern Europe. It is also but less commonly cultivated in North Africa, Siberia, Southwest Asia, and North America.

== History ==
Wild celery (Apium graveolens), from which both celeriac and celery derive, originated in Europe and the Mediterranean Basin. It was mentioned in the Iliad and Odyssey as selinon. (Note: Σέλινον has been translated by Richmond Lattimore as "the parsley that grows in wet places," by Murray as "parsley of the marsh," and by novelist Samuel Butler as "wild celery.") Celeriac was grown as a medicinal crop in some early civilizations.

== Culinary use ==
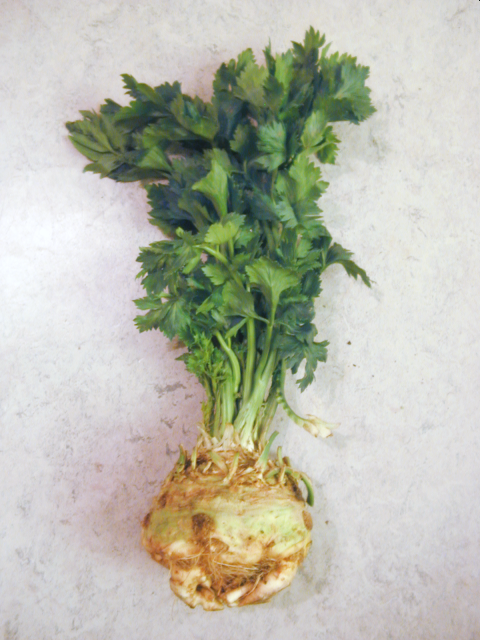
Celeriac harvested for eating

Typically, celeriac is harvested when its hypocotyl is 10 to 14 centimetres (4 to 5 1/2 inches) in diameter. This is white on the inside, and can be kept for months in winter. It often serves as a key ingredient in soup. It can also be shredded and used in salads. The leaves are used as seasoning; the small, fibrous stalks find only marginal use.

The shelf life of celeriac is approximately six to eight months if stored between 0 and 5 °C (32 and 41 °F), and not allowed to dry out. However, the vegetable will tend to rot through the centre if the finer stems surrounding the base are left attached. The centre of celeriac becomes hollow as it ages, though even freshly harvested celeriacs can have a small medial hollow. The freshness will also be obvious from the taste; the older it is, the weaker the celery flavour.

Celeriac (raw)
Nutritional value per 100 g (3.5 oz)
- Energy: 176 kJ (42 kcal)
- Carbohydrates: 9.2 g
- Sugars: 1.6 g
- Dietary fibre: 1.8 g
- Fat: 0.3 g
- Protein: 1.5 g
Vitamins and minerals
Vitamins	Quantity %DV^{†}
Thiamine (B1)	4% 0.05 mg
Riboflavin (B2)	5% 0.06 mg
Niacin (B3)	4% 0.7 mg
Pantothenic acid (B5)	7% 0.352 mg
Vitamin B6	10% 0.165 mg
Vitamin C	9% 8 mg
Vitamin K	34% 41 μg
Minerals	Quantity %DV^{†}
Calcium	3% 43 mg
Iron	4% 0.7 mg
Magnesium	5% 20 mg
Manganese	7% 0.158 mg
Phosphorus	9% 115 mg
Potassium	10% 300 mg
Sodium	4% 100 mg
Zinc	3% 0.33 mg
- Other constituents: Quantity
- Water: 88 g
- Link to USDA Database entry
- ^{†}Percentages estimated using US recommendations for adults, except for potassium, which is estimated based on expert recommendation from the National Academies.

== See also ==
- List of vegetables
- List of root vegetables
