= Phthalide =

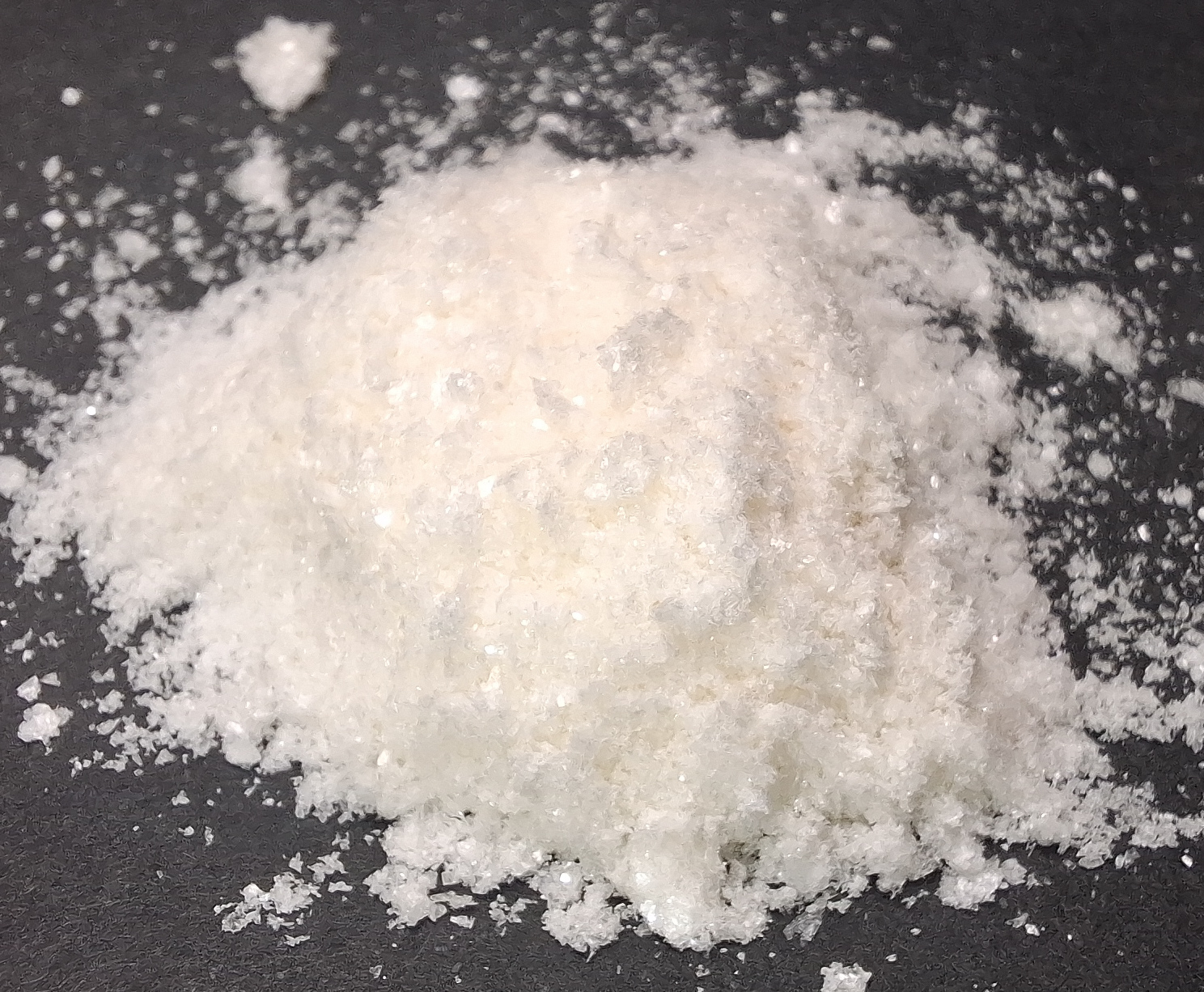
- Phthalide Powder

Names
- Preferred IUPAC name 2-Benzofuran-1(3H)-one
- Other names Phthalolactone

Identifiers
CAS Number	87-41-2
3D model (JSmol)	Interactive image
ChEBI	CHEBI:38085
ChemSpider	6621
ECHA InfoCard	100.001.586
PubChem CID	6885
UNII	8VV922U86J
CompTox Dashboard (EPA)	DTXSID0052594
- InChI: InChI=1S/C8H6O2/c9-8-7-4-2-1-3-6(7)5-10-8/h1-4H,5H2 Key: WNZQDUSMALZDQF-UHFFFAOYSA-N; InChI=1/C8H6O2/c9-8-7-4-2-1-3-6(7)5-10-8/h1-4H,5H2 Key: WNZQDUSMALZDQF-UHFFFAOYAW
- SMILES: O=C1OCc2ccccc12

Properties
Chemical formula	C_{8}H_{6}O_{2}
Molar mass	134.134 g·mol^{−1}
Melting point	75 to 77 °C (167 to 171 °F; 348 to 350 K)
Boiling point	290 °C (554 °F; 563 K)
- Except where otherwise noted, data are given for materials in their standard state (at 25 °C [77 °F], 100 kPa). Infobox references

Phthalide is an organic chemical compound with the molecular formula C_{8}H_{6}O_{2}. It is a white solid and the simplest benzo lactone. It is prepared from hydroxymethylbenzoic acid.

== Phthalides ==
The phthalide core is found in a variety of more complex chemical compounds including dyes (such as phenolphthalein), fungicides (such as tetrachlorophthalide, often referred to simply as "phthalide"), and natural oils (such as butylphthalide).

== Examples ==
Phenolphthalein

Tetrachlorophthalide

Butylphthalide

5-bromophthalide [64169-34-2] is used in the synthesis of Roxadustat and Citalopram.

3-(4'-chlorophenyl)phthalide is a chemical that serves function in the synthesis of Setazindol & Chlortalidone.

== Synthesis ==

Phthalide synthesis:

== Uses ==
Phthalide has known uses in the synthesis of hydralazine, & pipethiadene.

Phthalide is used in the synthesis of dibenzosuberone.
