= Abscisic-aldehyde oxidase =

Class of enzymes

Identifiers
- EC no.: 1.2.3.14

Databases
- IntEnz: IntEnz view
- BRENDA: BRENDA entry
- ExPASy: NiceZyme view
- KEGG: KEGG entry
- MetaCyc: metabolic pathway
- PRIAM: profile
- PDB structures: RCSB PDB PDBe PDBsum
Search
- PMC: articles
- PubMed: articles
- NCBI: proteins

In enzymology, abscisic-aldehyde oxidase (EC 1.2.3.14) is an enzyme that catalyzes the chemical reaction

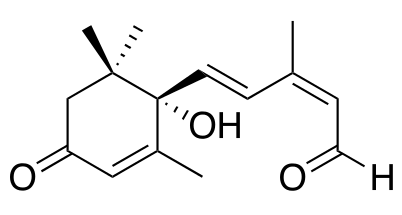
abscisic aldehyde
+ H_{2}O
O_{2}
H_{2}O_{2}
O_{2}
H_{2}O_{2}
abscisic acid

The three substrates of this enzyme are abscisic aldehyde, water, and oxygen. Its products are abscisic acid and hydrogen peroxide.

This enzyme belongs to the family of oxidoreductases, specifically those acting on the aldehyde or oxo group of donor with oxygen as acceptor. The systematic name of this enzyme class is abscisic-aldehyde:oxygen oxidoreductase. Other names in common use include abscisic aldehyde oxidase, AAO3, AOd, and AOdelta. This enzyme participates in carotenoid biosynthesis.
