= Phaseic acid =

Names
- Preferred IUPAC name (2Z,4E)-5-[(1R,5R,8S)-8-Hydroxy-1,5-dimethyl-3-oxo-6-oxabicyclo[3.2.1]octan-8-yl]-3-methylpenta-2,4-dienoic acid
- Other names Phaseic acid

Identifiers
CAS Number	24394-14-7
3D model (JSmol)	Interactive image
ChEBI	CHEBI:28205
ChEMBL	ChEMBL3594247
ChemSpider	4444860
KEGG	C09707
PubChem CID	5281527
UNII	YL2MMW26MJ
CompTox Dashboard (EPA)	DTXSID801028483
- InChI: InChI=1S/C15H20O5/c1-10(6-12(17)18)4-5-15(19)13(2)7-11(16)8-14(15,3)20-9-13/h4-6,19H,7-9H2,1-3H3,(H,17,18)/b5-4+,10-6-/t13-,14-,15+/m1/s1 Key: IZGYIFFQBZWOLJ-UUZREKTLSA-N; InChI=1/C15H20O5/c1-10(6-12(17)18)4-5-15(19)13(2)7-11(16)8-14(15,3)20-9-13/h4-6,19H,7-9H2,1-3H3,(H,17,18)/b5-4+,10-6-/t13-,14-,15+/m1/s1 Key: IZGYIFFQBZWOLJ-UUZREKTLBL
- SMILES: CC(\C=C[C@]1(O)[C@@]2(C)CO[C@]1(C)CC(=O)C2)=C\C(O)=O

Properties
Chemical formula	C_{15}H_{20}O_{5}
Molar mass	280.31 g/mol
- Except where otherwise noted, data are given for materials in their standard state (at 25 °C [77 °F], 100 kPa). verify (what is ?) Infobox references

Phaseic acid is a terpenoid catabolite of abscisic acid. Like abscisic acid, it is a plant hormone associated with photosynthesis arrest and abscission.

== Function ==
Abscisic acid (ABA) is a multifunctional plant hormone, playing roles in germination, seasonal growth patterns, and stress response. ABA levels are believed to be regulated in part by control of ABA catabolism, specifically by oxidation to form phaseic acid. Phaseic acid can therefore be thought of as a degradation product of ABA, although it may have other functions. The introduction of high phaseic acid concentrations have been found to impede stomatal closure and reduce photosynthesis in Arabidopsis but this may be a result of product inhibition rather than recognition of phaseic acid by a receptor.

Phaseic acid inhibits glutamate receptors in mouse brain.

== Biosynthesis ==
=== Early precursors ===
Phaseic acid is an isoprenoid, which means that it is derived from isoprene units. The activated terpene geranylgeranyl pyrophosphate is combined with itself to produce the common carotenoid precursor, lycopene.

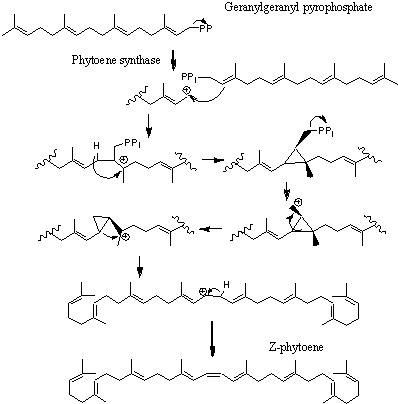
Two geranylgeranyl pyrophosphates are combined to form phytoene

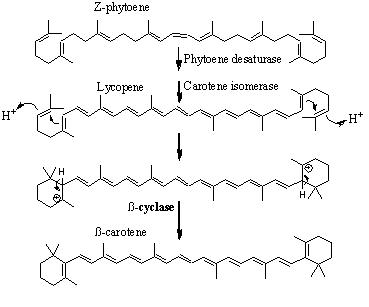
phytoene is isomerized and cyclized to produce β carotene

=== Carotenoid precursors ===
Phaseic acid is a product of abscisic acid, which is itself the product of the C_{40} carotenoid zeaxanthin via at least four enzymatic steps. Zeaxanthin is epoxidized to form violaxanthin or neoxanthin. The C_{15} end of the molecule is then cleaved by an epoxycarotenoid epoxygenase to form xanthoxin, an aldehyde.

β carotene is hydroxylated and epoxidated to form violaxanthin

The biosynthesis of xanthoxin

=== Modification of xanthoxin ===
Xanthoxin is reduced at the epoxy group and then hydroxylated at the aldehyde group, producing abscisic acid. The 8' hydroxylation of abscisate, abscisic acid's conjugate base, produces 8'-hydroxyabscisate. 8'-hydroxyabscisate cyclizes via nucleophilic attack of the existing ring by the 8' hydroxy group to interconvert with phaseate. The former process is known to be mediated by 8' abscisic acid hydroxylases, a family of NADPH-dependent enzymes. Saito et al. have demonstrated that, in the case of arabidopsis, these hydroxylases are independent of any regulatory mechanism downstream of translation itself. The latter process is reported to occur without enzymatic intervention, as it has been found to occur spontaneously in vitro.

The biosynthesis of phaseic acid

Xanthoxin is converted enzymatically to abscisic acid

Abscisic acid is oxidized to form phaseic acid
