= C15H20O3 =

The molecular formula C_{15}H_{20}O_{3} (molar mass: 248.32 g/mol, exact mass: 248.1412 u) may refer to:

- Abscisic aldehyde
- Amiloxate
- Parthenolide
- Periplanone B
