= Malva vein clearing virus =

Virus classification
- (unranked): Virus
- Realm: Riboviria
- Kingdom: Orthornavirae
- Phylum: Pisuviricota
- Class: Stelpaviricetes
- Order: Patatavirales
- Family: Potyviridae
- Genus: Potyvirus
- Species: Potyvirus malvae

Synonyms
- Malva green mosaic virus; Malva yellow vein mosaic virus

Species of virus

Malva vein clearing virus (MVCV) is a species of Potyvirus in the family Potyviridae that was isolated in 1957 from Malva sylvestris in Germany which is transmitted by the aphids Aphis umbrella and Myzus persicae. The insects mechanically inoculate the malvaceous hosts.

== Host range ==
Known hosts of the virus include Malva neglecta, M. nicaensis, M. parviflora, M. rotundifolia, M. sylvestris, Lavatera assurgentiflora, L. cretica, L. trimestris. In addition to the natural hosts, infection can be experimentally induced in some other species of the Malvaceae or mallow family. MVCV causes vein clearing and yellow mosaicism.

== Distribution ==
This virus has been reported from Tasmania, Brazil, the former Czechoslovakia, Germany, Israel, Italy, Portugal, California, Russia, the former Yugoslavia.

== See also ==
- Malva mosaic virus
