= Beta-D-glucopyranosyl abscisate beta-glucosidase =

Class of enzymes

Identifiers
- EC no.: 3.2.1.175

Databases
- BRENDA: enzyme data
- ExPASy: NiceZyme view
- KEGG: enzyme entry
- MetaCyc: metabolic pathway
- Rhea: reactions
- PDB structures: RCSB PDB PDBe PDBsum
Search
- PMC: articles
- PubMed: articles
- NCBI: proteins

Beta-D-glucopyranosyl abscisate beta-glucosidase (EC 3.2.1.175, AtBG1, ABA-beta-D-glucosidase, ABA-specific beta-glucosidase, ABA-GE hydrolase, beta-D-glucopyranosyl abscisate hydrolase) is an enzyme with systematic name beta-D-glucopyranosyl abscisate glucohydrolase. It catalyses the following chemical reaction

abscisic acid β-D-glucosyl ester
H_{2}O
abscisic acid
+
D-glucose

The enzyme characterised from barley and Arabidopsis thaliana removes the glycoside unit from the biologically inactive abscisic acid β-D-glucosyl ester to give the plant hormone, abscisic acid, and D-glucose.
