= Xanthoxin dehydrogenase =

Identifiers
- EC no.: 1.1.1.288

Databases
- IntEnz: IntEnz view
- BRENDA: BRENDA entry
- ExPASy: NiceZyme view
- KEGG: KEGG entry
- MetaCyc: metabolic pathway
- PRIAM: profile
- PDB structures: RCSB PDB PDBe PDBsum
Search
- PMC: articles
- PubMed: articles
- NCBI: proteins

In enzymology, xanthoxin dehydrogenase (EC 1.1.1.288) is an enzyme that catalyzes the chemical reaction

xanthoxin
+ NAD^{+}
H^{+}
H^{+}
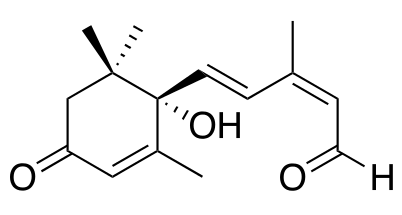
abscisic aldehyde
+ NADH

The two substrates of this enzyme are xanthoxin and oxidised nicotinamide adenine dinucleotide (NAD^{+}). Its products are abscisic aldehyde, reduced NADH, and a proton.

This enzyme belongs to the family of oxidoreductases, specifically those acting on the CH-OH group of donor with NAD^{+} or NADP^{+} as acceptor. The systematic name of this enzyme class is xanthoxin:NAD^{+} oxidoreductase. Other names in common use include xanthoxin oxidase, and ABA2. This enzyme participates in carotenoid biosynthesis.
