= Sean Cutler =

Sean R. Cutler is a Canadian-born American distinguished professor of plant cell biology at the University of California, Riverside. In 2009 Cutler showed how abscisic acid, a naturally-produced plant stress hormone, helps plants survive by inhibiting their growth in times of drought. Cutler also discovered pyrabactin, a synthetic chemical that mimics abscisic acid. His research was named by Science magazine as one of the top 10 breakthroughs of the year. In 2018, he was elected to the National Academy of Sciences.

Cutler received his B.A. and M.S. from the University of Toronto, and his Ph.D. from Stanford University.

He is a member of the Editorial Board for PNAS. He was elected to the US National Academy of Sciences in 2018.
