= Malva mosaic virus =

Virus classification
- (unranked): Virus
- Realm: Riboviria
- Kingdom: Orthornavirae
- Phylum: Kitrinoviricota
- Class: Alsuviricetes
- Order: Tymovirales
- Family: Alphaflexiviridae
- Genus: Potexvirus
- Species: Potexvirus malvae

Species of virus

Malva mosaic virus is a plant pathogenic virus of the family Alphaflexiviridae. It was discovered in 2008 and infects the common mallow (Malva neglecta). Its genome is about 6,800 nucleotides in length and it contains five major open reading frames.

== See also ==
- Malva vein clearing virus
