= Pyrabactin =

Names
- Preferred IUPAC name 4-Bromo-N-[(pyridin-2-yl)methyl]naphthalene-1-sulfonamide
- Other names 4-Bromo-N-(pyridin-2-ylmethyl)naphthalene-1-sulfonamide

Identifiers
CAS Number	419538-69-5
3D model (JSmol)	Interactive image
ChemSpider	958087
ECHA InfoCard	100.212.933
PubChem CID	1125790
UNII	L9PM5Q6DDW
CompTox Dashboard (EPA)	DTXSID80360553
- InChI: InChI=1S/C16H13BrN2O2S/c17-15-8-9-16(14-7-2-1-6-13(14)15)22(20,21)19-11-12-5-3-4-10-18-12/h1-10,19H,11H2 Key: GJSDYQXOSHKOGX-UHFFFAOYSA-N; InChI=1/C16H13BrN2O2S/c17-15-8-9-16(14-7-2-1-6-13(14)15)22(20,21)19-11-12-5-3-4-10-18-12/h1-10,19H,11H2 Key: GJSDYQXOSHKOGX-UHFFFAOYAQ
- SMILES: Brc2c1c(cccc1)c(cc2)S(=O)(=O)NCc3ncccc3

Properties
Chemical formula	C_{16}H_{13}BrN_{2}O_{2}S
Molar mass	377.26 g·mol^{−1}
Appearance	White to off-white powder
Solubility in DMSO	>10 mg/mL
- Except where otherwise noted, data are given for materials in their standard state (at 25 °C [77 °F], 100 kPa). Infobox references

Pyrabactin is a synthetic sulfonamide that mimics abscisic acid (ABA), a naturally produced stress hormone in plants that helps them cope with drought conditions by inhibiting growth. ABA can be manufactured for agricultural use; however, ABA is light-sensitive and costly to make. Pyrabactin is relatively inexpensive, easy to make, and not sensitive to light. Unlike ABA, pyrabactin activates only a few of the 14 ABA receptors in the plant needed for effective drought tolerance. Its role as an ABA mimic may make pyrabactin an important tool for protecting crops against drought and cold weather.

The discovery of pyrabactin by Sean Cutler was named a breakthrough research of 2009 by Science magazine.

Pyrabactin (for pyridyl containing ABA activator) is a naphthalene sulfonamide hypocotyl cell expansion inhibitor. A combination of genetic, transcriptomic and physiological evidence demonstrated that pyrabactin activates the ABA pathway in a manner very similar to ABA. As such, pyrabactin is the first ABA agonist that is not an ABA analog and may ultimately lead to the development of a new family of synthetic plant growth regulators.
