= LANCL2 =

Protein-coding gene in the species Homo sapiens

Identifiers
- Aliases: LANCL2, GPR69B, TASP, LanC like 2
- External IDs: OMIM: 612919; MGI: 1919085; HomoloGene: 23116; GeneCards: LANCL2; OMA:LANCL2 - orthologs

Gene location (Human)
Chr.	Chromosome 7 (human)
Band	7p11.2	Start	55,365,337 bp
Band	7p11.2	End	55,433,737 bp

Gene location (Mouse)
Chr.	Chromosome 6 (mouse)
Band	6|6 B3	Start	57,679,525 bp
Band	6|6 B3	End	57,716,424 bp
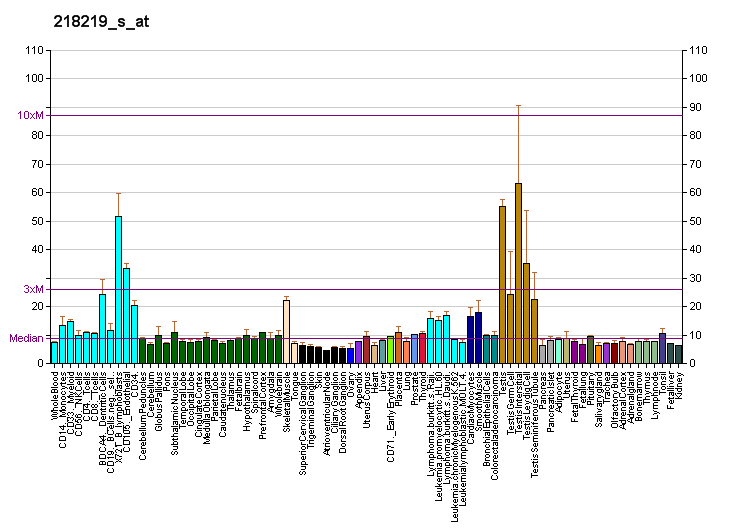
RNA expression pattern
Bgee	Human / Mouse (ortholog); Top expressed in: middle temporal gyrus; lateral nuclear group of thalamus; gonad; entorhinal cortex; postcentral gyrus; superior frontal gyrus; prefrontal cortex; Brodmann area 23; sperm; endothelial cell / Top expressed in: spermatocyte; spermatid; seminiferous tubule; subiculum; barrel cortex; genital tubercle; medial ganglionic eminence; prefrontal cortex; facial motor nucleus; tail of embryo; More reference expression data
BioGPS	More reference expression data
Gene ontology
Molecular function	phosphatidylinositol-4-phosphate binding; phosphatidylinositol-5-phosphate binding; GTP binding; protein binding; ATP binding; phosphatidylinositol-3-phosphate binding; catalytic activity
Cellular component	cytosol; plasma membrane; membrane; nucleus; cortical actin cytoskeleton; cytoplasm
Biological process	positive regulation of abscisic acid-activated signaling pathway; negative regulation of transcription, DNA-templated
Sources:Amigo / QuickGO
Orthologs
Species	Human	Mouse
Entrez	55915	71835
Ensembl	ENSG00000132434	ENSMUSG00000062190
UniProt	Q9NS86	Q9JJK2
RefSeq (mRNA)	NM_018697	NM_133737
RefSeq (protein)	NP_061167	NP_598498
Location (UCSC)	Chr 7: 55.37 – 55.43 Mb	Chr 6: 57.68 – 57.72 Mb
PubMed search
- Wikidata
View/Edit Human	View/Edit Mouse

LanC-like protein 2 is a protein that in humans is encoded by the LANCL2 gene. It is a protein broadly expressed in the plasma a nuclear membranes of immune, epithelial and muscle cells and a potential therapeutic target for chronic inflammatory, metabolic and immune-mediated diseases such as Crohn's disease and diabetes.

== Function ==
The natural ligand of LANCL2, abscisic acid (ABA), has been identified as a new endogenous mammalian hormone implicated in glycemic control. The mammalian ABA receptor has been identified as LANCL2 on the basis of (1) modeling predictions, (2) direct and specific ABA binding to the purified recombinant protein, and (3) abrogation of the functional effects of ABA by silencing of LANCL2 expression in ABA-sensitive cells.

Selective binding between LANCL2 and ABA or other ligands such as the benzimidazole NSC61610 and piperazine BT-11, lead to elevation of intracellular cAMP, activation of PKA and suppression of inflammation in macrophages. In hepatocytes, LANCL2 regulates cell survival by phosphorylation of Akt through its interaction with the Akt kinase mTORC2. Active mTORC2 causes translocation of GLUT4 to the plasma membrane and stimulates glucose uptake. LANCL2 expression in immune cells, adipose tissue, skeletal muscle and pancreas, and the potential to manipulate LANCL2 signaling and GLUT4 translocation with ABA make this G protein-coupled receptor a novel therapeutic target for glycemic control. In humans, ABA release was detected with increasing glycemia, although this mechanism failed in people suffering from type 2 and gestational diabetes. Also, plasma ABA concentrations increase after oral glucose load (OGTT) in healthy subjects. ABA stimulates glucose-dependent insulin release from human and rodent pancreatic β-cells. At a low dose (micrograms/Kg body weight) oral ABA significantly reduces both glycemia and insulinemia in rats and in humans undergoing an OGTT indicating that ABA reduces the amount of insulin required to control hyperglycemia. This insulin-sparing effect suggests that LANCL2 can be used as a therapeutic target for the treatment of inflammatory and metabolic diseases such as metabolic syndrome, prediabetes and diabetes.

Novel LANCL2 ligands such as BT-11 significantly decrease disease activity in the Dextran Sodium Sulfate (DSS)-induced model of acute colitis and the IL-10-/- mice and CD4+ T cell transfer-induced chronic colitis models. BT-11 treatment decreased leukocytic infiltration, mucosal thickening and epithelial erosion in the colon, decreased Th1 and Th17 CD4+ T cells and TNFα while increasing regulatory T cells, LANCL2 and IL-10 expression.

== Activators ==
- Omilancor
