= Abscisic acid =

Plant hormone

- Stereo, skeletal formula of abscisic acid

Names
- Preferred IUPAC name (2Z,4E)-5-[(1S)-1-Hydroxy-2,6,6-trimethyl-4-oxocyclohex-2-en-1-yl]-3-methylpenta-2,4-dienoic acid
- Other names (2Z,4E)-(S)-5-(1-Hydroxy-2,6,6-trimethyl-4-oxo-2-cyclohexen-1-yl)-3-methyl-2,4-pentanedienoic acid; Dormic acid; Dormin

Identifiers
CAS Number	21293-29-8
3D model (JSmol)	Interactive image
Abbreviations	ABA
Beilstein Reference	2698956
ChEBI	CHEBI:2365
ChEMBL	ChEMBL288040
ChemSpider	4444418
ECHA InfoCard	100.040.275
EC Number	244-319-5
MeSH	Abscisic+Acid
PubChem CID	5280896
RTECS number	RZ2475100
UNII	72S9A8J5GW
CompTox Dashboard (EPA)	DTXSID0036766
- InChI: InChI=1S/C15H20O4/c1-10(7-13(17)18)5-6-15(19)11(2)8-12(16)9-14(15,3)4/h5-8,19H,9H2,1-4H3,(H,17,18)/b6-5+,10-7-/t15-/m1/s1 Key: JLIDBLDQVAYHNE-YKALOCIXSA-N
- SMILES: OC(=O)\C=C(\C)/C=C/[C@@]1(O)C(C)=CC(=O)CC1(C)C

Properties
Chemical formula	C_{15}H_{20}O_{4}
Molar mass	264.321 g·mol^{−1}
Appearance	Colorless crystals
Density	1.193 g/mL
Melting point	163 °C (325 °F; 436 K)
log P	1.896
Acidity (pK_{a})	4.868
Basicity (pK_{b})	9.129

Hazards
- GHS labelling
Pictograms	(GHS07: Exclamation mark)
Signal word	Warning
Hazard statements	H315, H319, H335
Precautionary statements	P261, P264, P271, P280, P302+P352, P304+P340, P305+P351+P338, P312, P321, P332+P313, P337+P313, P362, P403+P233, P405, P501
- Except where otherwise noted, data are given for materials in their standard state (at 25 °C [77 °F], 100 kPa). verify (what is ?) Infobox references

Abscisic acid (ABA or abscisin II) is a plant hormone. ABA functions in many plant developmental processes, including seed and bud dormancy, the control of organ size and stomatal closure. It is especially important for plants in the response to environmental stresses, including drought, soil salinity, cold tolerance, freezing tolerance, heat stress and heavy metal ion tolerance.

== Discovery ==
In the 1940s, Torsten Hemberg, while working at the University of Stockholm, found evidence that a positive correlation exists between the rest period and the occurrence of an acidic ether soluble growth inhibitor in potato tubers.

In 1963, abscisic acid was first identified and characterized as a plant hormone by Frederick T. Addicott and Larry A. Davis. They were studying compounds that cause abscission (shedding) of cotton fruits (bolls). Two compounds were isolated and called abscisin I and abscisin II. Abscisin II is presently called abscisic acid (ABA).

== In plants ==
=== Function ===
ABA was originally believed to be involved in abscission, which is how it received its name. This is now known to be the case only in a small number of plants. ABA-mediated signaling also plays an important part in plant responses to environmental stress and plant pathogens. The plant genes for ABA biosynthesis and sequence of the pathway have been elucidated. ABA is also produced by some plant pathogenic fungi via a biosynthetic route different from ABA biosynthesis in plants.

In preparation for winter, ABA is produced in terminal buds. This slows plant growth and directs leaf primordia to develop scales to protect the dormant buds during the cold season. ABA also inhibits the division of cells in the vascular cambium, adjusting to cold conditions in the winter by suspending primary and secondary growth.

Abscisic acid is also produced in the roots in response to decreased soil water potential (which is associated with dry soil) and other situations in which the plant may be under stress. ABA then translocates to the leaves, where it rapidly alters the osmotic potential of stomatal guard cells, causing them to shrink and stomata to close. The ABA-induced stomatal closure reduces transpiration (evaporation of water out of the stomata), thus preventing further water loss from the leaves in times of low water availability. A close linear correlation was found between the ABA content of the leaves and their conductance (stomatal resistance) on a leaf area basis.

Seed germination is inhibited by ABA in antagonism with gibberellin. ABA also prevents loss of seed dormancy.

Several ABA-mutant Arabidopsis thaliana plants have been identified and are available from the Nottingham Arabidopsis Stock Centre - both those deficient in ABA production and those with altered sensitivity to its action. Plants that are hypersensitive or insensitive to ABA show phenotypes in seed dormancy, germination, stomatal regulation, and some mutants show stunted growth and brown/yellow leaves. These mutants reflect the importance of ABA in seed germination and early embryo development.

Pyrabactin (a pyridyl containing ABA activator) is a naphthalene sulfonamide hypocotyl cell expansion inhibitor, which is an agonist of the seed ABA signaling pathway. It is the first agonist of the ABA pathway that is not structurally related to ABA.

=== Homeostasis ===
==== Biosynthesis ====
Abscisic acid (ABA) is an isoprenoid plant hormone, which is synthesized in the plastidal 2-C-methyl-D-erythritol-4-phosphate (MEP) pathway; unlike the structurally related sesquiterpenes, which are formed from the mevalonic acid-derived precursor farnesyl diphosphate (FDP), the C_{15} backbone of ABA is formed after cleavage of C_{40} carotenoids in MEP. Zeaxanthin is the first committed ABA precursor; a series of enzyme-catalyzed epoxidations and isomerizations via violaxanthin, and final cleavage of the C_{40} carotenoid by a dioxygenation reaction yields the proximal ABA precursor, xanthoxin, which is then further oxidized to ABA via abscisic aldehyde.

Abamine has been designed, synthesized, developed and then patented as the first specific ABA biosynthesis inhibitor, which makes it possible to regulate endogenous levels of ABA.

==== Locations and timing of ABA biosynthesis ====
- Synthesized in nearly all plant tissues, e.g., roots, flowers, leaves and stems
- Stored in mesophyll (chlorenchyma) cells where it is conjugated to glucose via uridine diphosphate-glucosyltransferase resulting in the inactivated form, ABA-glucose-ester
- Activated and released from the chlorenchyma in response to environmental stress, such as heat stress, water stress, salt stress
- Released during desiccation of the vegetative tissues and when roots encounter soil compaction.
- Synthesized in green fruits at the beginning of the winter period
- Synthesized in maturing seeds, establishing dormancy
- Mobile within the leaf and can be rapidly translocated from the leaves to the roots (opposite of previous belief) in the phloem
- Accumulation in the roots modifies lateral root development, improving the stress response
- ABA is synthesized in almost all cells that contain chloroplasts or amyloplasts

==== Inactivation ====
ABA can be catabolized to phaseic acid via CYP707A (a group of P450 enzymes) or inactivated by glucose conjugation (ABA-glucose ester) via the enzyme uridine diphosphate-glucosyltransferase (UDP-glucosyltransferase). Catabolism via the CYP707As is very important for ABA homeostasis, and mutants in those genes generally accumulate higher levels of ABA than lines overexpressing ABA biosynthetic genes. In soil bacteria, an alternative catabolic pathway leading to dehydrovomifoliol via the enzyme vomifoliol dehydrogenase has been reported.

=== Effects ===
- Antitranspirant - Induces stomatal closure, decreasing transpiration to prevent water loss.
- Promotes root growth during periods of low humidity.
- Inhibits fruit ripening
- Responsible for seed dormancy by inhibiting cell growth – inhibits seed germination
- Inhibits the synthesis of Kinetin nucleotide
- Downregulates enzymes needed for photosynthesis.
- Acts on endodermis to prevent growth of roots when exposed to salty conditions
- Promotion of plant antiviral immunity

=== Signal cascade ===
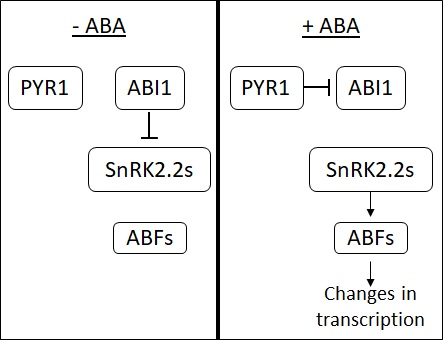
ABA signal pathway in plants

In the absence of ABA, the phosphatase ABA-INSENSITIVE1 (ABI1) inhibits the action of SNF1-related protein kinases (subfamily 2) (SnRK2s). ABA is perceived by the PYRABACTIN RESISTANCE 1 (PYR1) and PYR1-like membrane proteins. On ABA binding, PYR1 binds to and inhibits ABI1. When SnRK2s are released from inhibition, they activate several transcription factors from the ABA RESPONSIVE ELEMENT-BINDING FACTOR (ABF) family. ABFs then go on to cause changes in the expression of a large number of genes. Around 10% of plant genes are thought to be regulated by ABA.

== In fungi ==
Like plants, some fungal species (for example Cercospora rosicola, Botrytis cinerea and Magnaporthe oryzae) have an endogenous biosynthesis pathway for ABA. In fungi, it seems to be the MVA biosynthetic pathway that is predominant (rather than the MEP pathway that is responsible for ABA biosynthesis in plants). One role of ABA produced by these pathogens seems to be to suppress the plant immune responses.

== In animals ==
ABA has also been found to be present in metazoans, from sponges up to mammals including humans. Currently, its biosynthesis and biological role in animals is poorly known. ABA elicits potent anti-inflammatory and anti-diabetic effects in mouse models of diabetes/obesity, inflammatory bowel disease, atherosclerosis and influenza infection. Many biological effects in animals have been studied using ABA as a nutraceutical or pharmacognostic drug, but ABA is also generated endogenously by some cells (like macrophages) when stimulated. There are also conflicting conclusions from different studies, where some claim that ABA is essential for pro-inflammatory responses whereas other show anti-inflammatory effects. Like with many natural substances with medical properties, ABA has become popular also in naturopathy. While ABA clearly has beneficial biological activities and many naturopathic remedies will contain high levels of ABA (such as wheatgrass juice, fruits and vegetables), some of the health claims made may be exaggerated or overly optimistic. In mammalian cells ABA targets a protein known as lanthionine synthetase C-like 2 (LANCL2), triggering an alternative mechanism of activation of peroxisome proliferator-activated receptor gamma (PPAR gamma). LANCL2 is conserved in plants and was originally suggested to be an ABA receptor also in plants, which was later challenged.

== Measurement of ABA concentration ==
Several methods can help to quantify the concentration of abscisic acid in a variety of plant tissue. The quantitative methods used are based on HPLC and ELISA. Two independent FRET probes can measure intracellular ABA concentrations in real time in vivo.
