= (+)-abscisic acid 8'-hydroxylase =

Class of enzymes

Identifiers
- EC no.: 1.14.13.93
- CAS no.: 153190-37-5

Databases
- IntEnz: IntEnz view
- BRENDA: BRENDA entry
- ExPASy: NiceZyme view
- KEGG: KEGG entry
- MetaCyc: metabolic pathway
- PRIAM: profile
- PDB structures: RCSB PDB PDBe PDBsum
- Gene Ontology: AmiGO / QuickGO
Search
- PMC: articles
- PubMed: articles
- NCBI: proteins

In enzymology, a (+)-abscisic acid 8'-hydroxylase (EC 1.14.13.93) is an enzyme that catalyzes the chemical reaction

(+)-abscisate + NADPH + H^{+} + O_{2} $\rightleftharpoons$ 8'-hydroxyabscisate + NADP^{+} + H_{2}O

The four substrates of this enzyme are (+)-abscisate, NADPH, H^{+}, and O_{2}, whereas its three products are 8'-hydroxy-abscisate, NADP^{+}, and H_{2}O.

This enzyme belongs to the family of oxidoreductases, to be specific those acting on paired donors, with O_{2} as oxidant and incorporation or reduction of oxygen. The oxygen incorporated need not be derived from O_{2} with NADH or NADPH as one donor, and incorporation of one atom of oxygen into the other donor. This enzyme participates in carotenoid biosynthesis.

== Nomenclature ==
The systematic name of this enzyme class is abscisate,NADPH:oxygen oxidoreductase (8'-hydroxylating). Other names in common use include

- (+)-ABA 8'-hydroxylase and
- ABA 8'-hydroxylase.
