= Omilancor =

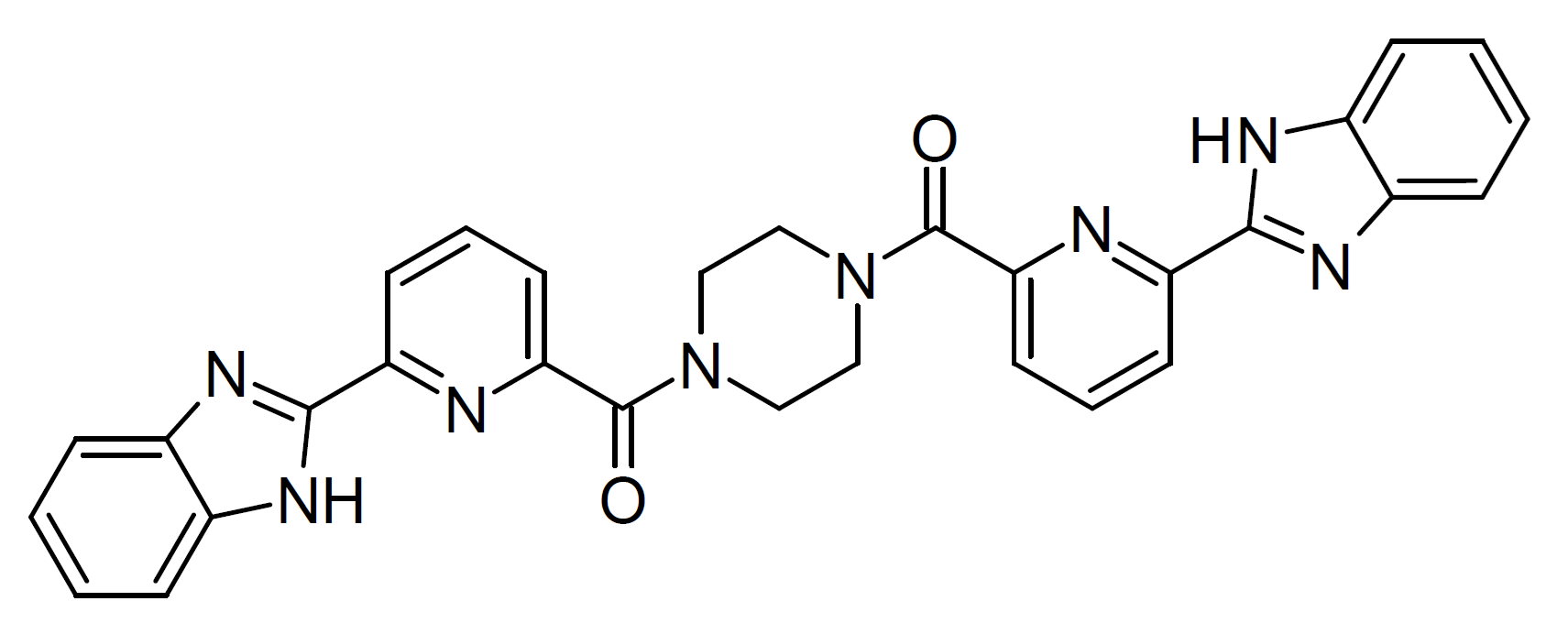

Identifiers
- IUPAC name: [4-[6-(1H-benzimidazol-2-yl)pyridine-2-carbonyl]piperazin-1-yl]-[6-(1H-benzimidazol-2-yl)pyridin-2-yl]methanone
- CAS Number: 1912399-75-7
- PubChem CID: 121299620
- IUPHAR/BPS: 10363
- DrugBank: DB19277
- ChemSpider: 64907766
- UNII: A4Y49H6YY8
- ChEMBL: ChEMBL4788758

Chemical and physical data
- Formula: C_{30}H_{24}N_{8}O_{2}
- Molar mass: 528.576 g·mol^{−1}
- 3D model (JSmol): Interactive image
- SMILES: C1CN(CCN1C(=O)C2=CC=CC(=N2)C3=NC4=CC=CC=C4N3)C(=O)C5=CC=CC(=N5)C6=NC7=CC=CC=C7N6
- InChI: InChI=1S/C30H24N8O2/c39-29(25-13-5-11-23(31-25)27-33-19-7-1-2-8-20(19)34-27)37-15-17-38(18-16-37)30(40)26-14-6-12-24(32-26)28-35-21-9-3-4-10-22(21)36-28/h1-14H,15-18H2,(H,33,34)(H,35,36); Key:MVHWZNBAQIGPOQ-UHFFFAOYSA-N

Omilancor (BT-11) is an experimental drug which acts as an activator of the protein Lanthionine Synthetase C-like 2 (LANCL2). It has antiinflammatory effects and shows efficacy against psoriasis as well as inflammatory bowel conditions, and is in clinical trials for the treatment of Crohn's disease and ulcerative colitis. It also shows affinity for the enzyme MAP2K6 and may have potential application in the treatment of intervertebral disc degeneration.
