= Freezing tolerance =

Ability of plants to withstand cold temperatures

Freezing tolerance describes the ability of plants to withstand subzero temperatures through the formation of ice crystals in the xylem and intercellular space, or apoplast, of their cells. Freezing tolerance is enhanced as a gradual adaptation to low temperature through a process known as cold acclimation, which initiates the transition to prepare for subzero temperatures through alterations in rate of metabolism, hormone levels and sugars. Freezing tolerance is rapidly enhanced during the first days of the cold acclimation process when temperature drops. Depending on the plant species, maximum freezing tolerance can be reached after only two weeks of exposure to low temperatures. The ability to control intercellular ice formation during freezing is critical to the survival of freeze-tolerant plants. If intracellular ice forms, it could be lethal to the plant when adhesion between cellular membranes and walls occur. The process of freezing tolerance through cold acclimation is a two-stage mechanism:

- The first stage occurs at relatively high subzero temperatures as the water present in plant tissues freezes outside the cell.
- The second stage occurs at lower temperatures as intercellular ice continues to form.

Within the apoplast, antifreeze proteins localize the growth of ice crystals by ice nucleators in order to prevent physical damage to tissues and to promote supercooling within freezing-sensitive tissues and cells. Osmotic stress, including dehydration, high salinity, as well as treatment with abscisic acid, can also enhance freezing tolerance.

Freezing tolerance can be assessed by performing a simple plant survival assay or with the more time consuming but quantitative electrolyte leakage assay.

Plants are not the only organisms capable of withstanding subzero temperatures. Wood frogs, juvenile painted turtles, goldenrod gall fly larvae, and intertidal periwinkle snails have all been shown to be capable of the same. They convert up to 70% of their total body water into ice accumulating in extracellular spaces. In order to perform such remarkable acts, several biochemical adaptations have been identified as supporting factors to freeze tolerance. These include the following:

- Proteins: Nucleating proteins induce and regulate the whole process of extracellular freezing. Certain proteins, named ice restructuring proteins or antifreeze proteins, stop small ice crystals from recrystallizing into larger crystals that can cause physical damage to tissues.
- Cryoprotectants: These are several factors that prevent intracellular freezing, prevent excessive reduction of cell volume, and stabilize protein conformation. This most commonly include high concentrations of polyhydric alcohols (glycerol, sorbitol) and sugars (glucose) that are packed into the cell. Other protectants are trehalose and proline which prevent the membrane bilayer from collapsing.
- Ischemia tolerance: in order for cells and organs to survive without circulation of the blood, good antioxidant defenses and elevated chaperone proteins are required. They help protect cell macromolecules, whilst metabolic rate depression greatly reduces cell energy needed whilst frozen.

New work in the field focuses primarily on four different topics. These include:

- Identification of novel genes and their protein products found in freeze tolerant species.
- Exploration of a huge range of other genes/proteins that address many different issues in cell preservation and viability.
- Studies of important transcription factors that mediate the freeze-tolerance response.
- Analysis of biochemical mechanisms that regulate gene and protein expression in regards to microRNA, protein phosphorylation, and epigenetic controls.
