= Vomifoliol dehydrogenase =

vomifoliol 4'-dehydrogenase

Identifiers
- EC no.: 1.1.1.221
- CAS no.: 94949-18-5

Databases
- IntEnz: IntEnz view
- BRENDA: BRENDA entry
- ExPASy: NiceZyme view
- KEGG: KEGG entry
- MetaCyc: metabolic pathway
- PRIAM: profile
- PDB structures: RCSB PDB PDBe PDBsum
- Gene Ontology: AmiGO / QuickGO
Search
- PMC: articles
- PubMed: articles
- NCBI: proteins

In enzymology, a vomifoliol dehydrogenase (EC 1.1.1.221) is an enzyme that catalyzes the chemical reaction

(6S,9R)-6-hydroxy-3-oxo-alpha-ionol + NAD^{+} $\rightleftharpoons$ (6R)-6-hydroxy-3-oxo-alpha-ionone + NADH + H^{+}

Thus, the two substrates of this enzyme are (6S,9R)-6-hydroxy-3-oxo-alpha-ionol and NAD^{+}, whereas its 3 products are (6R)-6-hydroxy-3-oxo-alpha-ionone, NADH, and H^{+}.

This enzyme belongs to the family of oxidoreductases, specifically those acting on the CH-OH group of donor with NAD^{+} or NADP^{+} as acceptor. The systematic name of this enzyme class is vomifoliol:NAD^{+} oxidoreductase. Other names in common use include vomifoliol 4'-dehydrogenase, and vomifoliol:NAD^{+} 4'-oxidoreductase.
