= Pyr1 =

Names
- Preferred IUPAC name 5,11-Dimethyl-1-oxo-2,6-dihydro-1H-pyrido[4,3-b]carbazol-9-yl benzoate
- Other names LIMINIB

Identifiers
CAS Number	83947-94-8
3D model (JSmol)	Interactive image
ChemSpider	61709937
PubChem CID	13074411
UNII	YL48YW74QQ
CompTox Dashboard (EPA)	DTXSID201030494
- InChI: InChI=1S/C24H18N2O3/c1-13-17-10-11-25-23(27)21(17)14(2)20-18-12-16(8-9-19(18)26-22(13)20)29-24(28)15-6-4-3-5-7-15/h3-12,26H,1-2H3,(H,25,27) Key: BPGBAEXPBQHBSV-UHFFFAOYSA-N
- SMILES: O=C(C1=CC=CC=C1)OC(C=C2)=CC3=C2NC4=C3C(C)=C5C(C=CNC5=O)=C4C

Properties
Chemical formula	C_{24}H_{18}N_{2}O_{3}
Molar mass	382.419 g·mol^{−1}
- Except where otherwise noted, data are given for materials in their standard state (at 25 °C [77 °F], 100 kPa). Infobox references

Pyr1 (LIMINIB) is an organic compound composed of carbon, hydrogen, oxygen and nitrogen that inhibits the enzyme LIM kinase.

It was discovered by the Cure and Inserm Institute, CNRS and CEA in the 2010s. The studies in vitro and with animals, prove that this molecule has a completely new mechanism of action that could be used against chemotherapy resistant cells.

Pyr1 reversibly stabilizes microtubules, blocks actin microfilament dynamics and inhibits cell motility in vitro. These characteristics confer not only anticancer properties but also the capacity to prevent metastasis to the molecule.

== Description and properties ==
Pyr1 is classified as a small molecule that belongs to the group of pyridocarbazoles. Its small size gives it special properties: as a light molecule it is a valuable tool for studying dynamic biological processes. Therefore, it is a key discovery in medical and biological investigation. It is a high degree protein temporal controller, as it is able to interact in a few minutes or even seconds with molecules such as LIMK1. Its reversibility enables it to quickly activate and inhibit itself, making the molecule a specific inhibitor both in vitro and in cellulo.

Pyr1 can be described as a tetracyclic molecule with a simple structure. Its few radicals are widely expanded along the benzene rings, distinguishing a benzoyloxy group in the ninth carbon and two methyl radicals in carbon five and eleven. There is also a ketone group in carbon one and two hydrogen radicals in carbons two and six.

== Mechanism of action ==
Pyr 1 is a cell permeable competitive inhibitor of Lim Kinase (especially LIMK1). The latter is the enzyme that uses ATP to phosphorylate and inactivate the actin-depolymerizing factor cofilin. When cofilin is phosphorylated, it regulates actin dynamics. LIMK1 also depolymerizes microtubules.

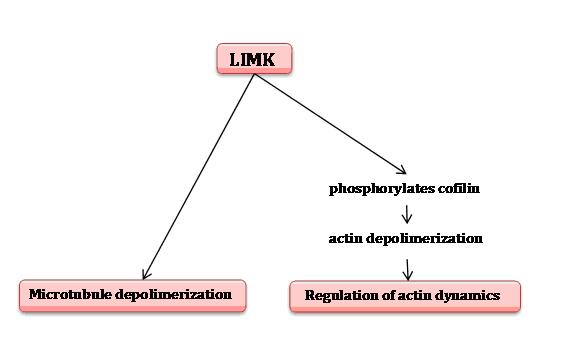
Mechanism of action of LIMK1

In the presence of Pyr1, LIMK1 is inhibited, which means that the phosphorylation of cofilin decreases, which results in the blockage of the regulation of actin microfilaments dynamics and, therefore, the disorganization of microfilaments. It also causes the stabilization of microtubules. This inhibition is reversible.

In conclusion, Pyr1 inhibits cell motility and controls actin dynamics and stabilizes microtubules. These properties can be used in anticancer treatment.

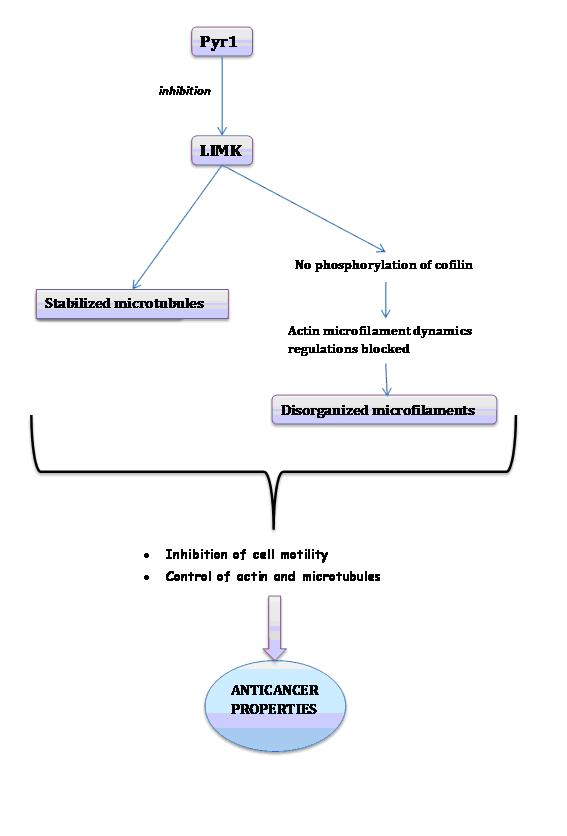
Mechanism of action of Pyr1

== Medical applications ==
Cancer metastasis consists in the fast and uncontrolled division of abnormal cells. Microtubules have a key role in mitosis: they generate the mitotic spindle assembly, which allows chromosome segregation and the cell division. Their stabilization leads to the inability of cells to reproduce or to their apoptosis. That is why microtubule targeting agents are, nowadays, powerful anticancer drugs. It also explains why tubulin is now considered as one of the most highly validated cancer targets.

These anticancer drugs have, however, some limitations due to side effects, principally myelosuppression and neurotoxicity. But the main inconvenience is that many cancers are, or become, resistant to these drugs. Several strategies have been proposed for the development of more effective and less toxic anticancer drugs. One of them is to use molecules that can induce the stabilization of microtubules, and Pyr1 is one of them.

Pyr1 may be used in cancer treatment, because its main target enzyme (LIM kinase) is a regulator of microtubule and actin dynamics. Moreover, it has been shown that Pyr1 is toxic for cancerous cell lines, even the ones that are resistant to conventional microtubule targeting agents.

Furthermore, the toxicity of Pyr1 has been studied in mice, to evaluate whether it could really work as a chemotherapeutic agent. The results show a complete survival of mice against xenografted tumors with no apparent toxicity, as there was no loss of weight observed. Therefore, it has been concluded that Pyr1 has a good therapeutic efficacy preventing tumor growth at doses that are well tolerated by animals.

Bearing the previous points in mind, Pyr1 may be used in addition or as an alternative to standard chemotherapy in drug resistant tumors.
