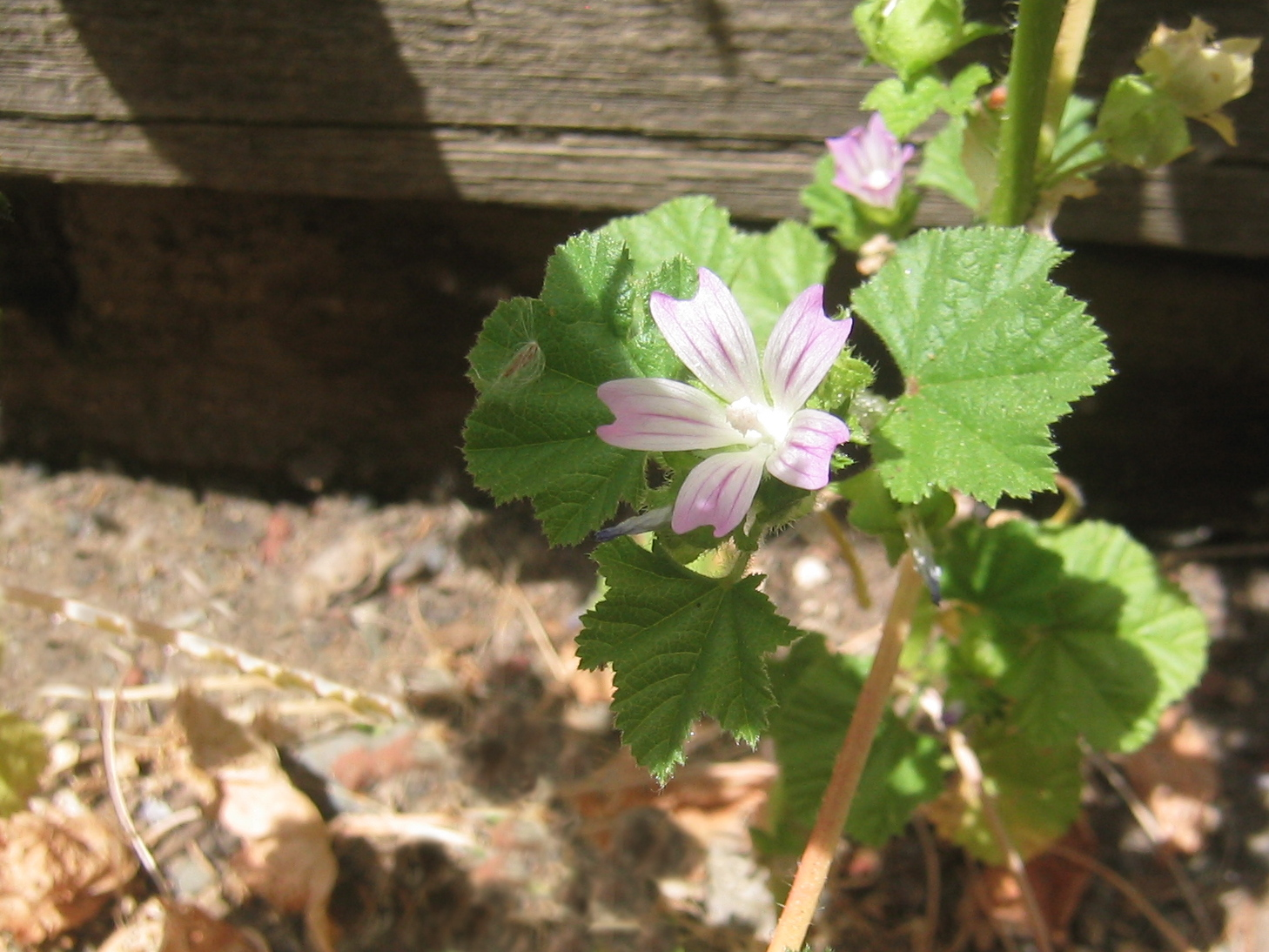

Scientific classification
- Kingdom: Plantae
- Clade: Tracheophytes
- Clade: Angiosperms
- Clade: Eudicots
- Clade: Rosids
- Order: Malvales
- Family: Malvaceae
- Genus: Malva
- Species: M. neglecta

Binomial name
- Malva neglecta Wallr.

Synonyms
- List: Malva fruticans Dorner ex Rchb.; Malva orbiculata Pomel; Malva prostrata Gilib.; Malva rotundifolia var. crispa Wimm. & Grab.; Malva rotundifolia var. grandior Wahlenb.; Malva rotundifolia var. intermedia Ball; Malva rotundifolia var. perennans Post; Malva salvitellensis V.Brig.; Malva vulgaris Fr.

= Malva neglecta =

Plant species in the mallow family

Malva neglecta is a species of plant of the family Malvaceae, native to most of the Old World except sub-Saharan Africa. It is an annual growing to 0.6 m (2 ft). It is known as common mallow in the United States and also as buttonweed, cheeseplant, cheeseweed, dwarf mallow, and roundleaf mallow. This plant is often consumed as a food, with its leaves, stalks and seed all being considered edible. This is especially true of the seeds, which contain 21% protein and 15.2% fat.

== Description ==
Dwarf mallow is a prostrate, downy, herbaceous plant, growing to approximately 60 cm (24 in). The leaves are alternate with long, strongly channeled petioles, up to 12 cm (4.7 in), and narrowly triangular stipules. It is a broadleaf winter annual that also persists through a biennial or perennial life cycle if environmental conditions are favorable. Each leaf is reniform or with 5–7 shallow lobes, the basal leaves are 3–7 cm (1.2–2.8 in). It grows a tough taproot. The flowers are single-stalked and occur in clusters of 2–5 in the leaf axils. The flower stalks are shorter than the leaf stalks, with the leaves partially obscuring the flowers. The fruits are schizocarps, which split into 10–12 mericarps (nutlets) and are smooth and hairy.

In addition to daily phototropic movements, leaves show epinasty, geotropism and sleeping behaviors. Leaves joined to the stem on the east side of the plant bend abaxially and leaves on the west side of the plant bend adaxially, while leaves on the north and south sides turn sideways. Overnight, leaves were observed returning to their morning position.

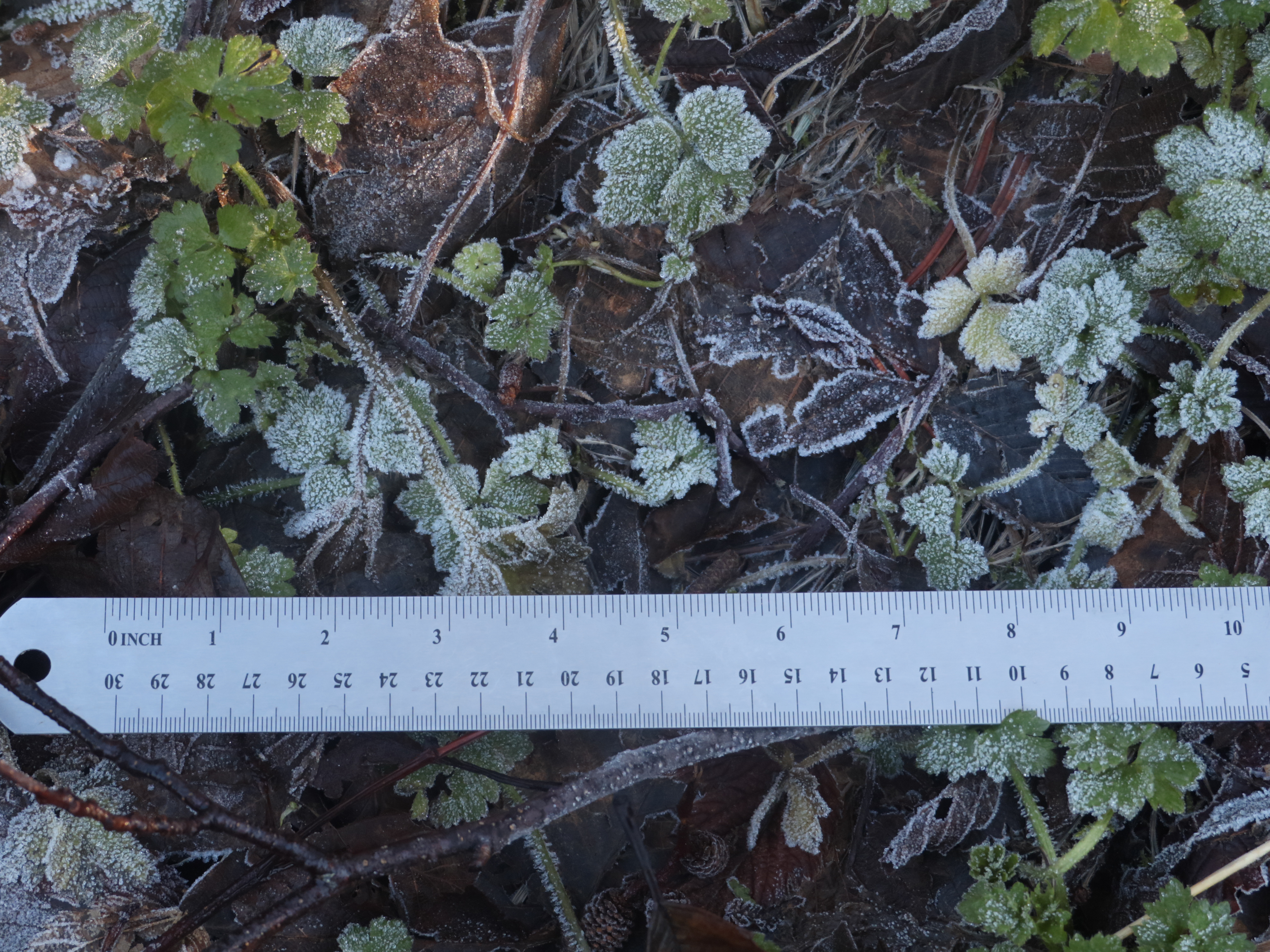
Frost tolerance seen in Canada

After introduction into Canada, common mallow was found to be freezing tolerant, retaining the capacity for photosynthesis and respiration after long periods of exposure to subfreezing temperatures.

== Life cycle ==
Malva neglecta exhibits six age states: seedlings, juveniles, immatures, virginals, young generatives, and middle-aged generatives. Seedling leaf blades are pubescent below and along the edge. Juvenile plants have a solitary shoot and rounded leaves with wavy toothed edges. Immature plants show kidney-shaped leaves with jagged edges. Virginile plants present rosettes of 3-5 rounded heart-shaped leaves. Young generative plants develop solitary white or light pink flowers. Branching of the generative shoot is observed in Middle-aged plants. While young leaves and stems are green, mature leaves and lower stems vary from green to purple in color.

== Ecology ==
=== Acyrthosiphon Malvae ===
Although the ecology is more complex, in the Thames valley, Acyrthosiphon Malvae (informally Aphis Malvae) is the common aphid found feeding on common mallow.

== Distribution ==
Native
Palearctic:

Macaronesia: Canary Islands
Northern Africa: Algeria, Morocco
Arabian Peninsula: Saudi Arabia
Western Asia: Afghanistan, Cyprus, Sinai, Iran, Iraq, Jordan, Lebanon, Historic Palestine, Syria, Turkey
Caucasus: Armenia, Azerbaijan, Georgia
Soviet Middle Asia: Kazakhstan, Kyrgyzstan, Tajikistan, Turkmenistan, Uzbekistan
Mongolia: Mongolia
China: Xinjiang
Indian Subcontinent: India, Pakistan
Northern Europe: Denmark, Ireland, Norway, Sweden, United Kingdom
Middle Europe: Austria, Belgium, Czech Republic, Germany, Hungary, Netherlands, Poland, Slovakia, Switzerland
Southeastern Europe: Albania, Bosnia and Herzegovina, Bulgaria, Croatia, Greece, Italy, Montenegro, North Macedonia, Sardinia, Serbia, Slovenia, Romania,
Southwestern Europe: France, Portugal, Spain

== Uses ==
The plant has 1-octacosanol, ascorbic acid, choline, alkaloids, and saponin (the plant has a certain antioxidant content). It has a high nitrate content, similar to that of arugula. The flowers contain tannins.

=== Therapeutic ===
A common traditionally used medicinal plant, used for catarrh, enteritis, sore throat, hoarse voice, and as an expectorant. A lab study has shown that the plant is good for stomach ulcers

=== Seeds ===
The seeds can be eaten raw or cooked and have a nutty flavor. Mature seeds can be cooked like rice or grains. In the past, seeds were ground into flour in times of need.

=== Root ===
The root can be ground and used as a meringue substitute by boiling in water, simmering until thickened, and then whisked like egg whites.

=== Leaves ===
Leaves are useful in salads, can be eaten raw, and contain Vitamin C, significant protein and mineral content. In culinary applications, it is cooked similar to spinach, or used for thickening soups, as the leaves release a thickening agent similar to okra which is also in the mallow family. In Morocco leaves are known as Bakola or Khobiza, braised as a side dish (called salad, but cooked) or used as a sauce over couscous. In Jewish and Egyptian cooking, leaves are made into a stew called Mulukhiyah.

== Botanical gallery ==
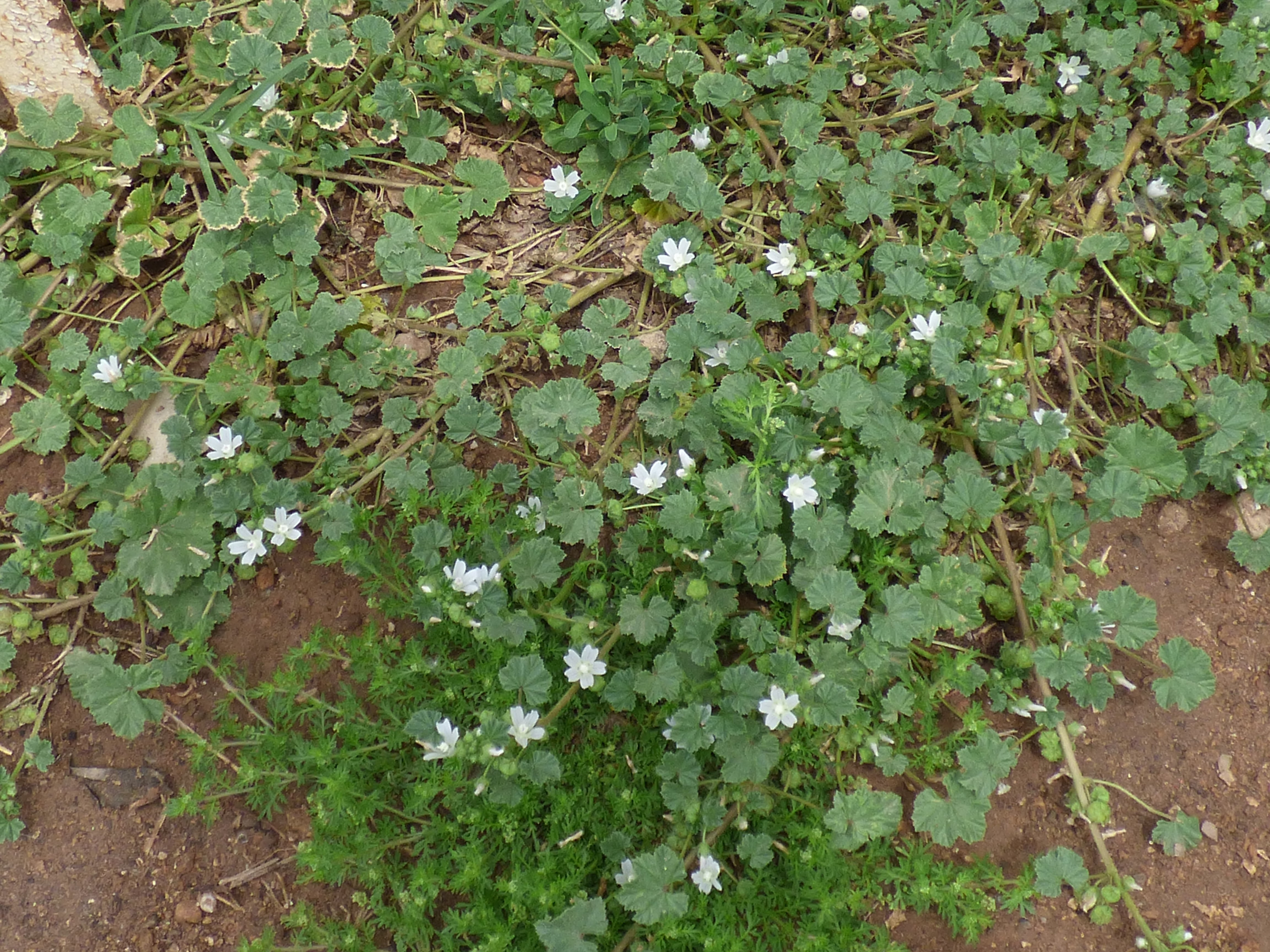
Plant spreads along ground, leaves not large, leaves fairly uniform size (Antalya)

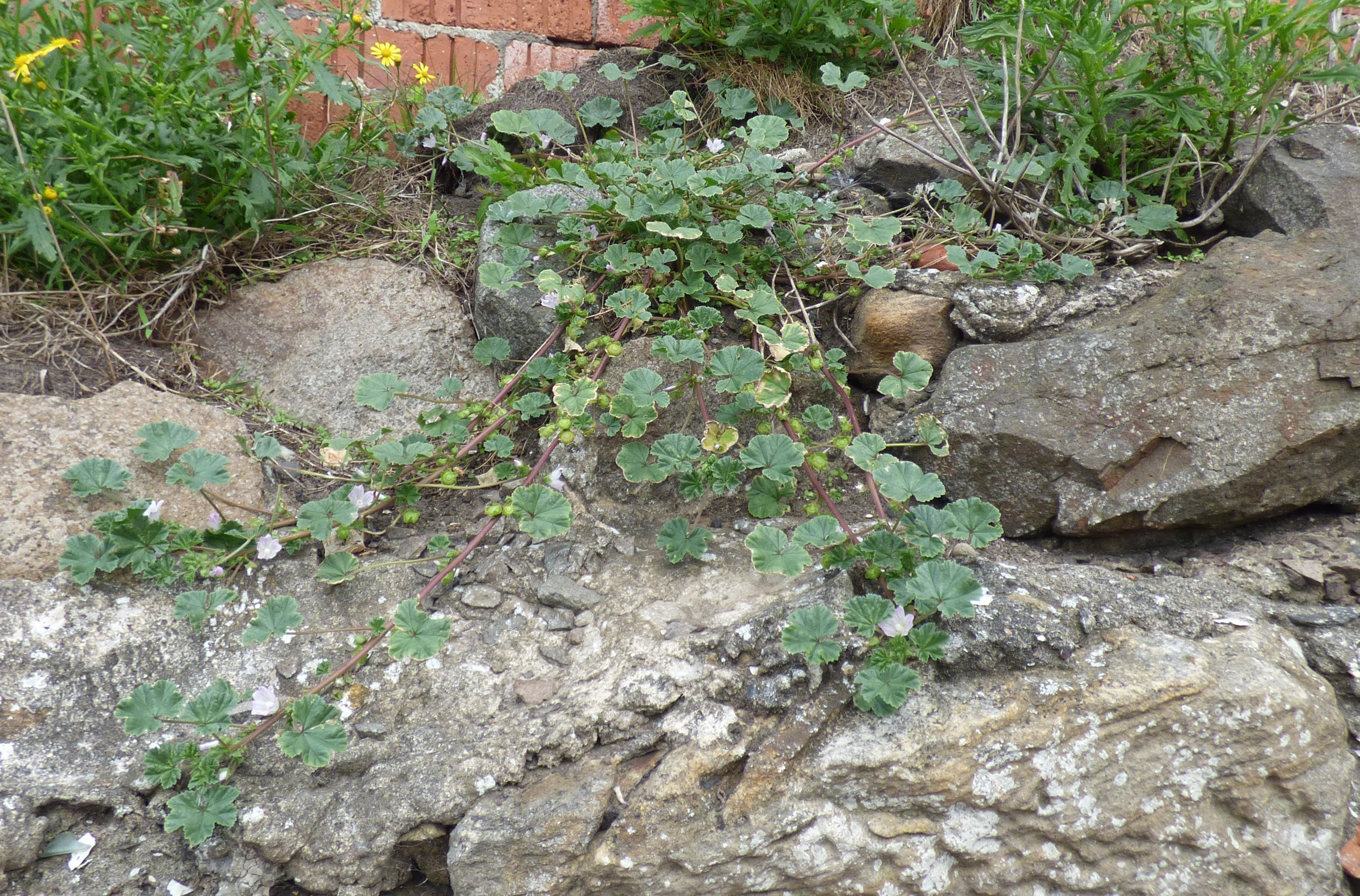
Spreading on rocks, similarly (Edinburgh)

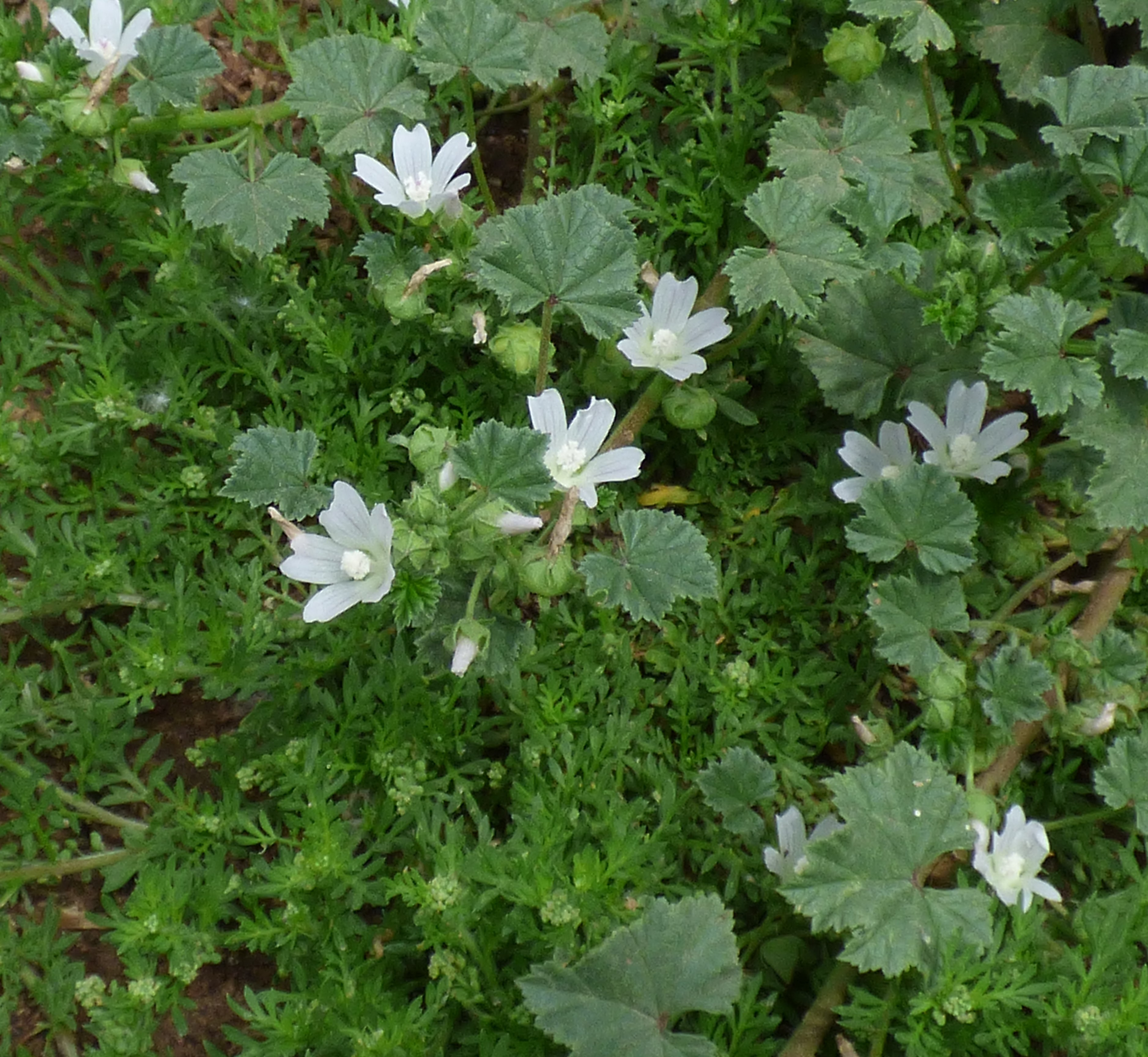
Flowers, fruits and leaves

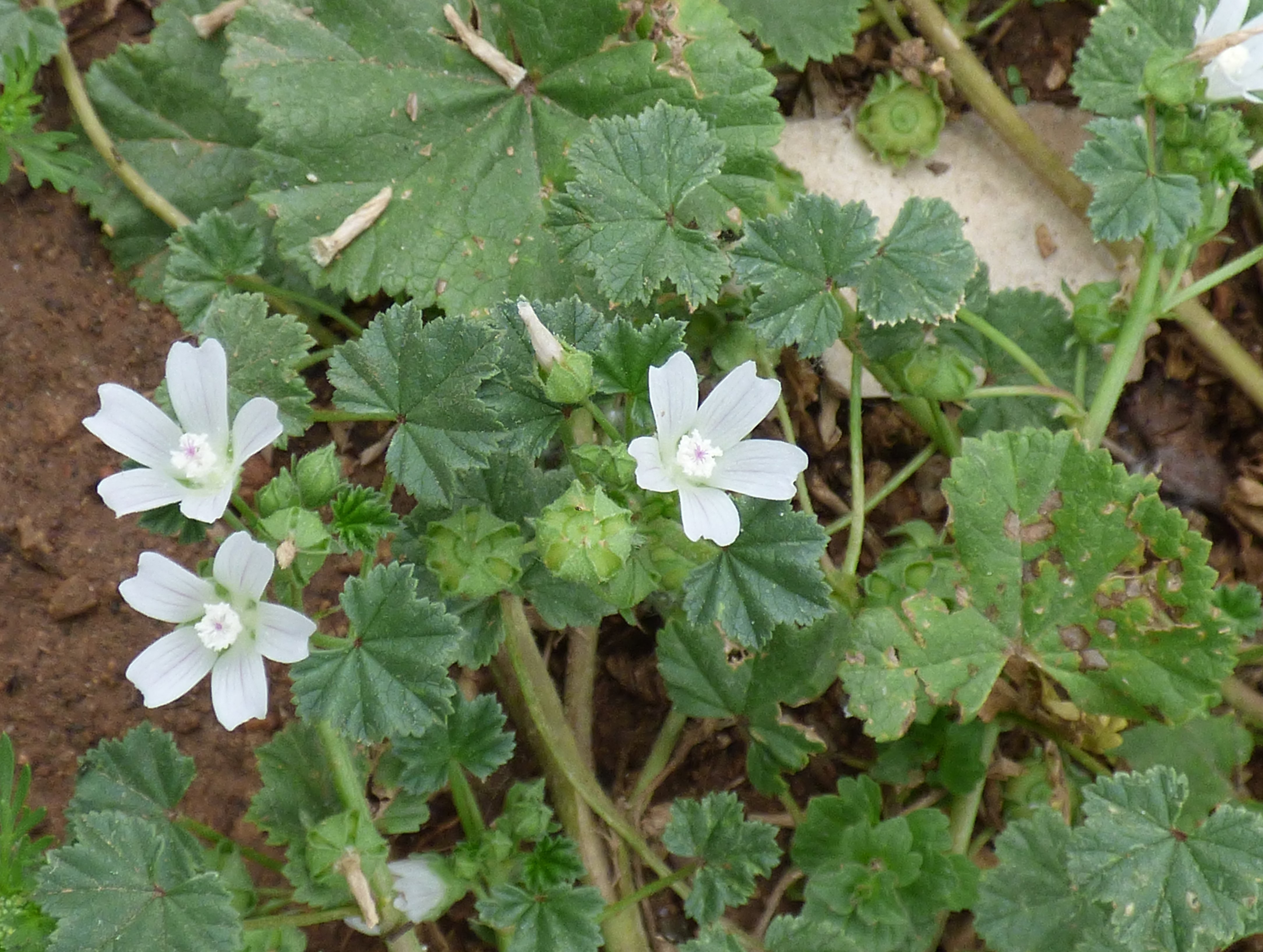
Flowers, fruits and leaves, closer

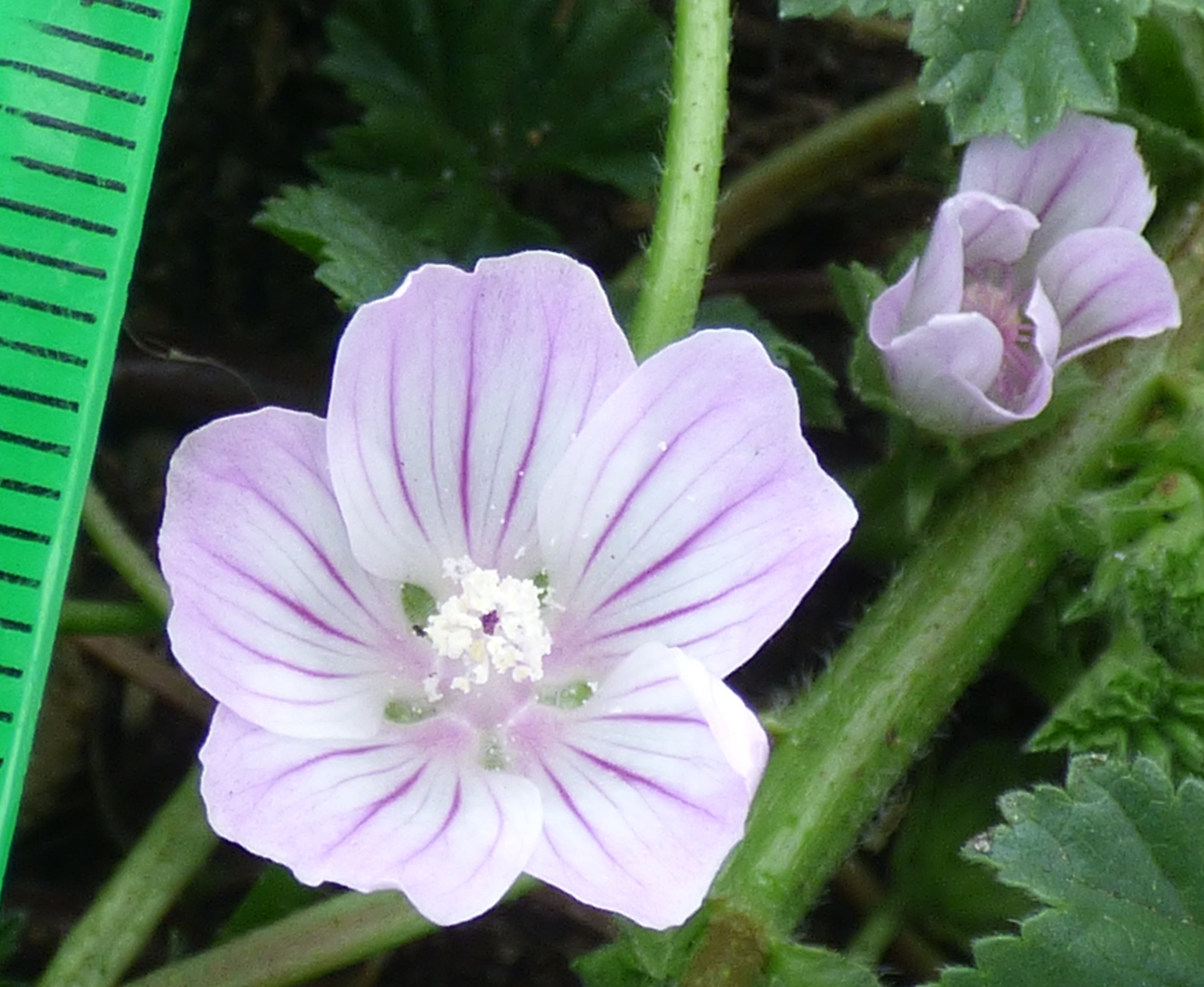
Flowers can be pink with bold veins or may be pale

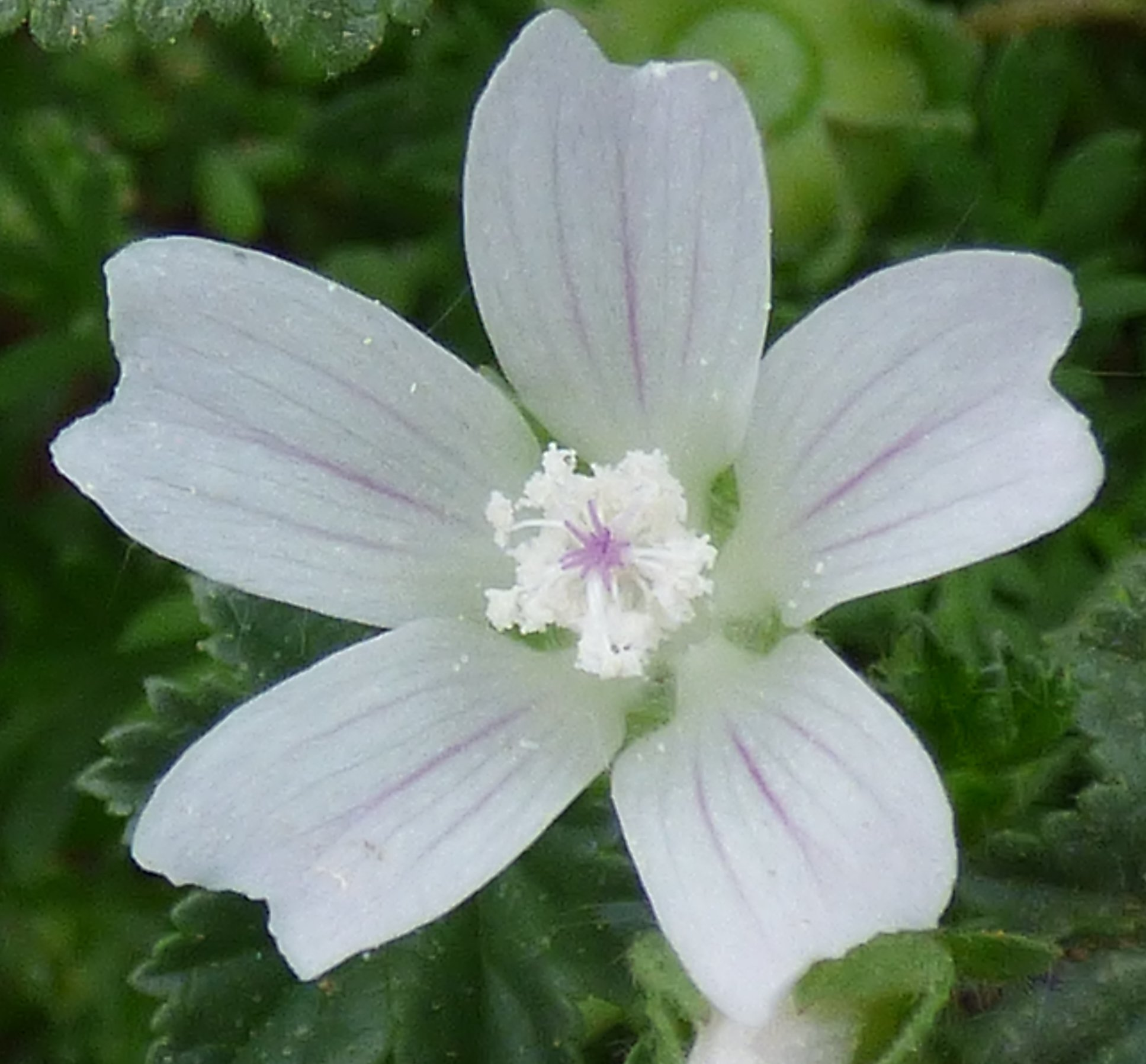
Paler form, hairs (visible) in centre at petal stalks

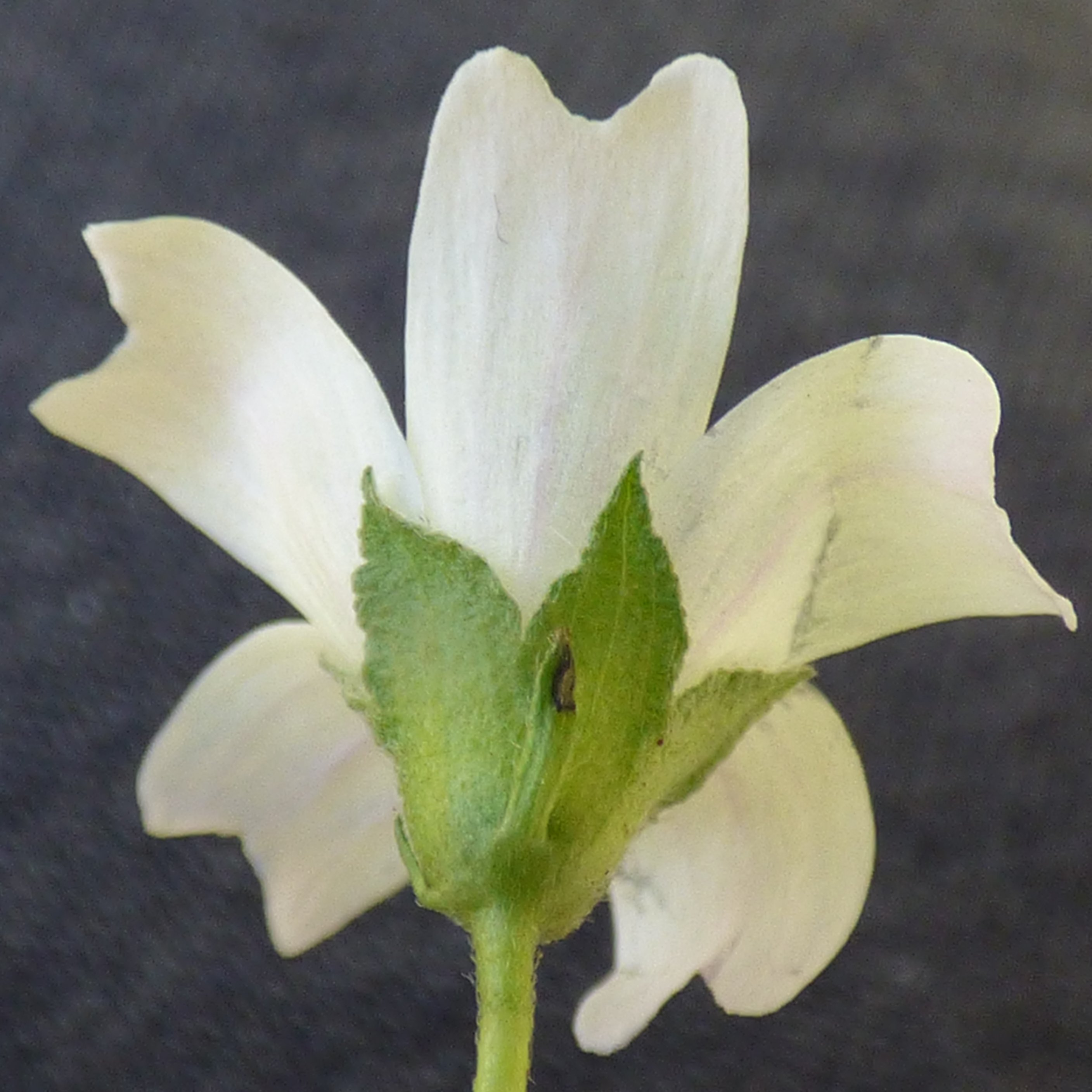
Flower much larger than calyx, green calyx with 5 broad parts, epicalyx at base formed of 3 narrow strips

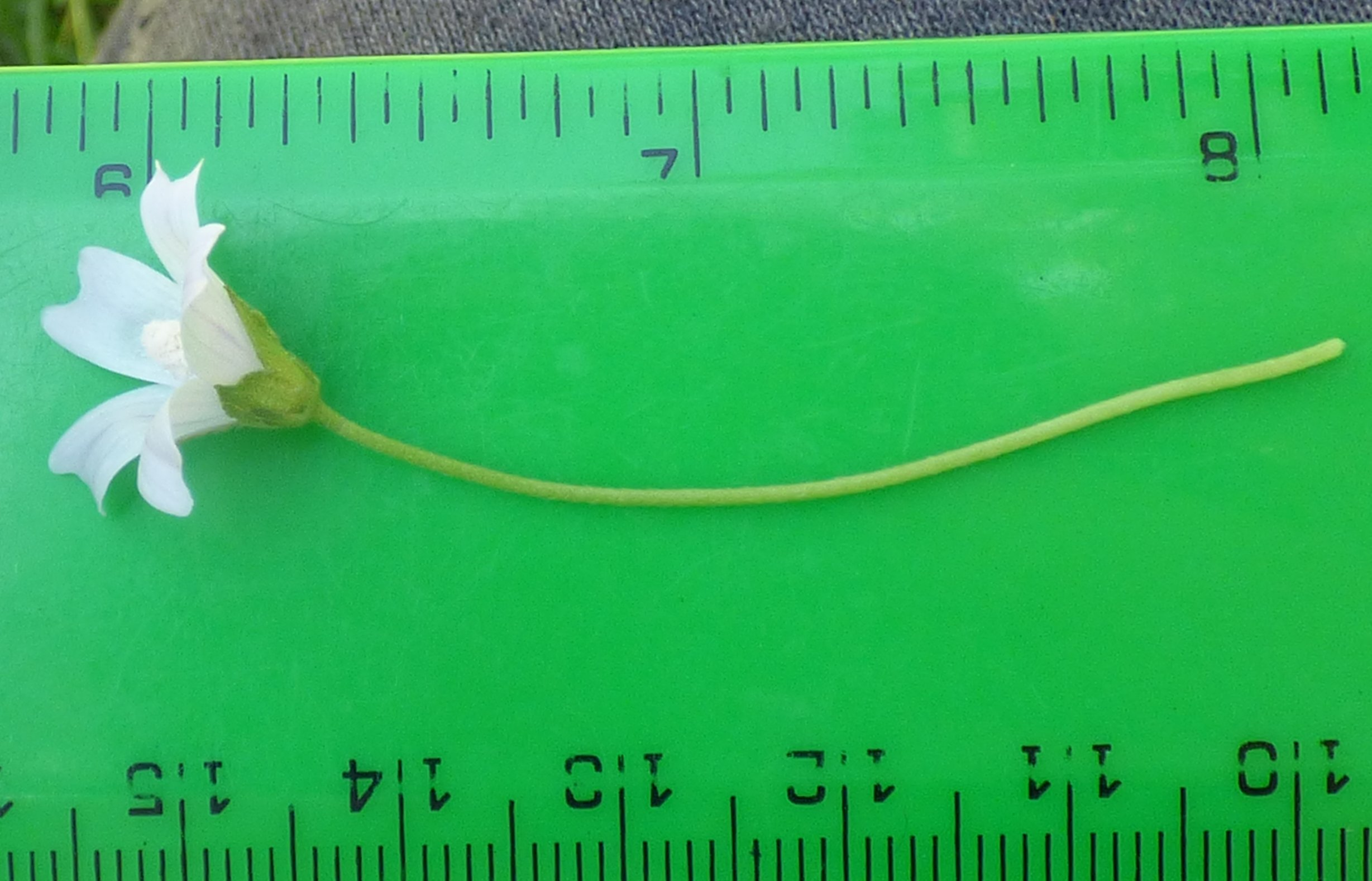
Flowers may have long to very long stalks

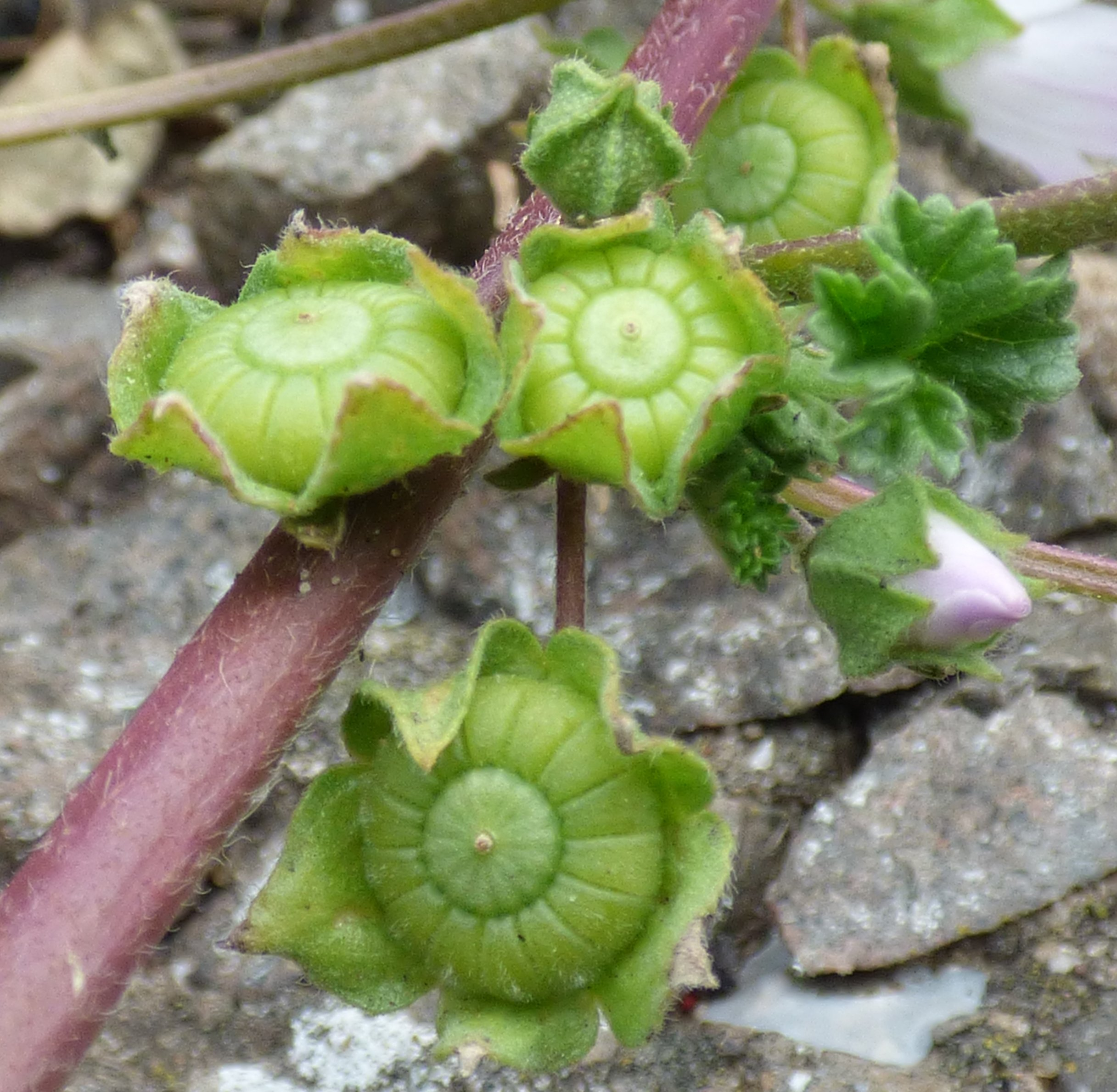
Fruits

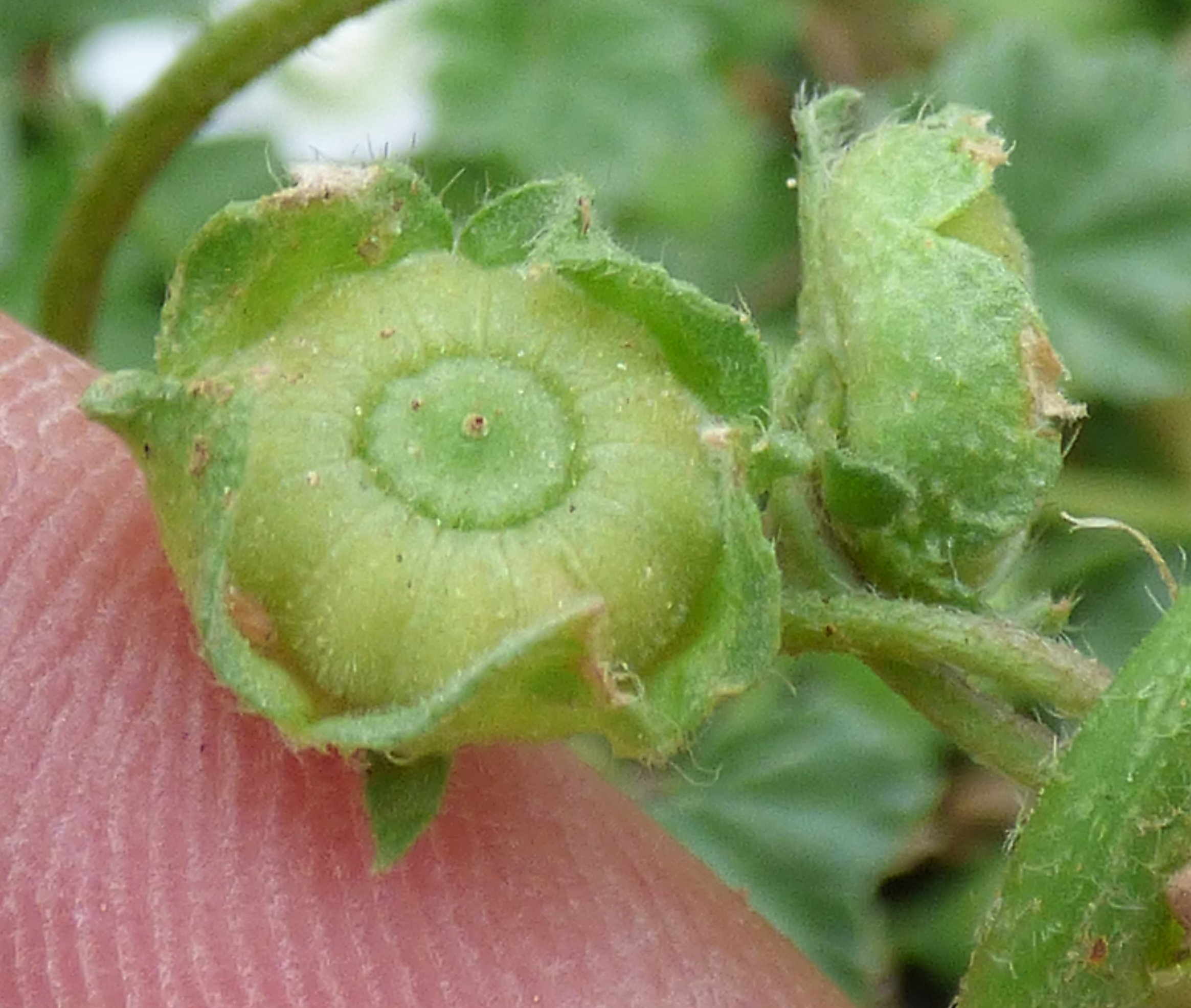
Fruits

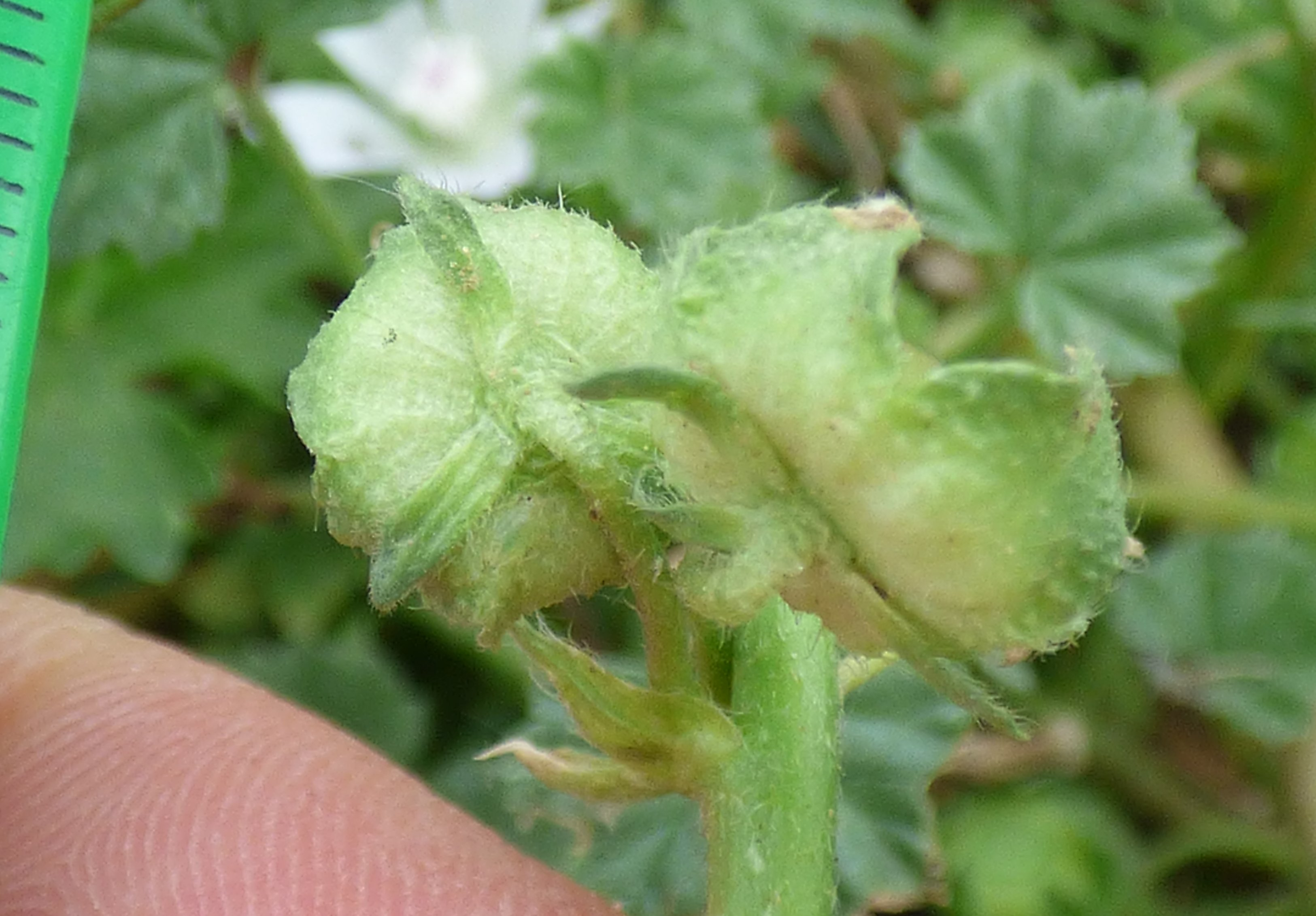
Fruiting undersides, showing epicalyx of 3 narrow strips

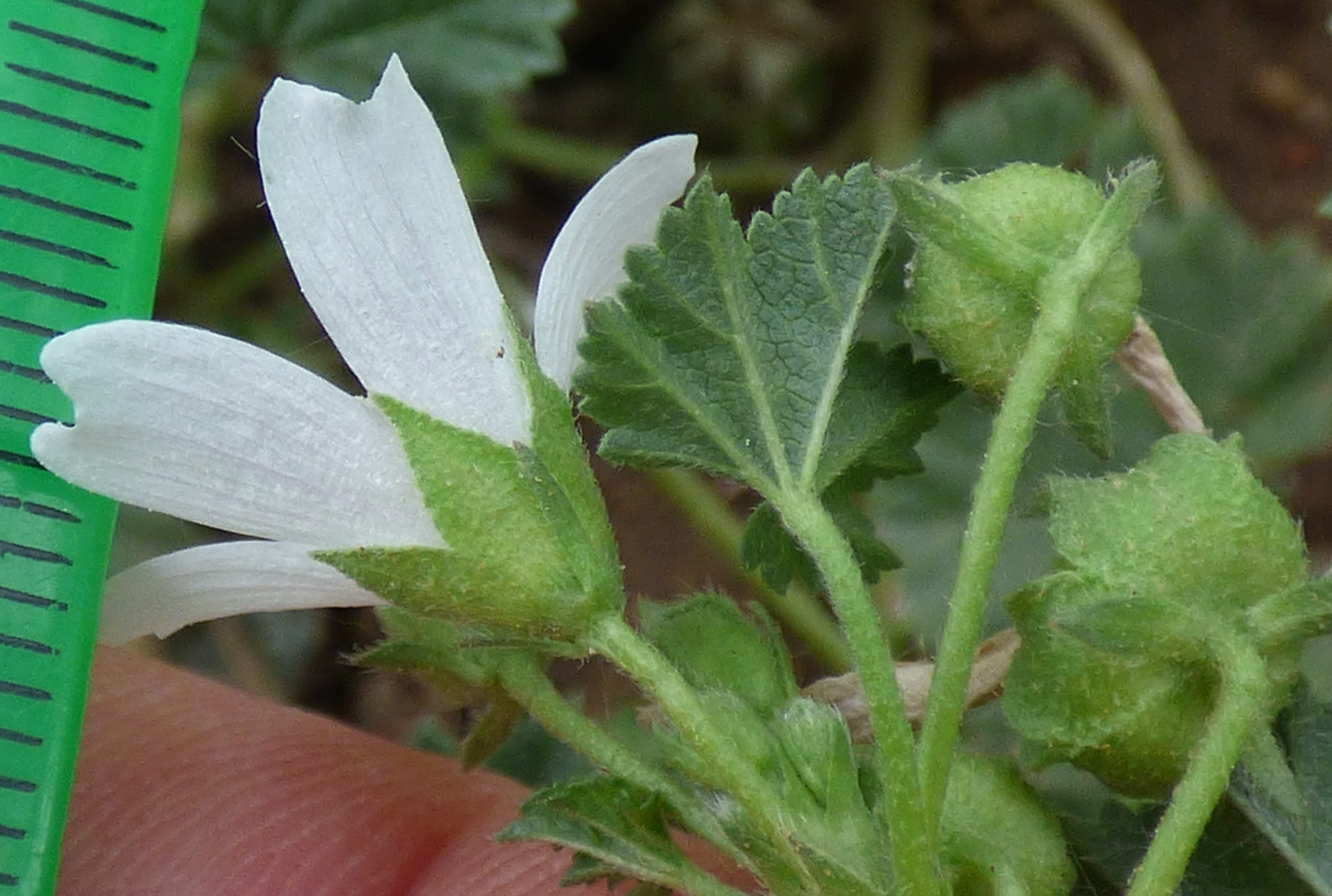
Flowers and fruits from side showing the features above, stalks reasonably long

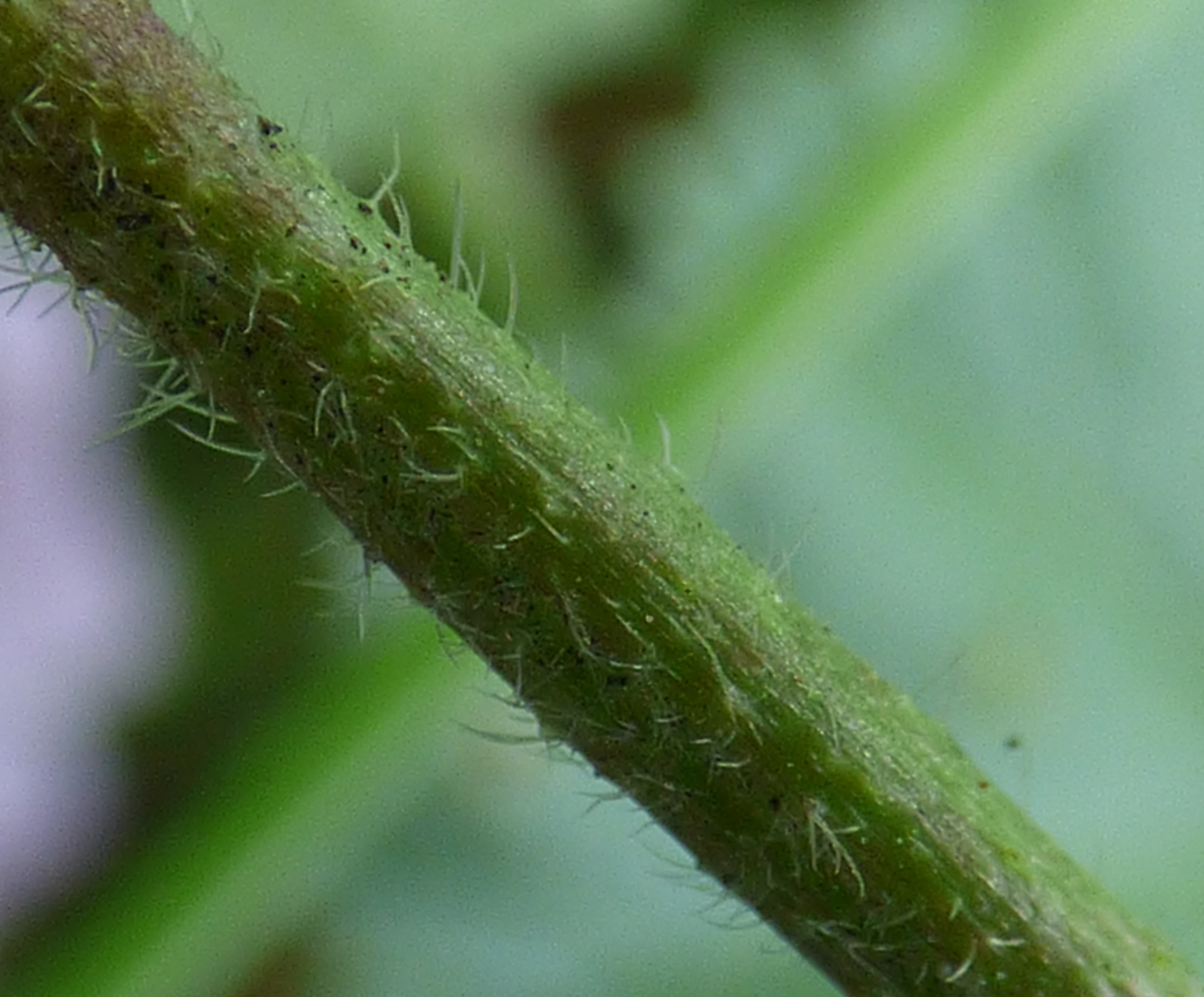
Hairs a mixture of stellate (star-like) and simple

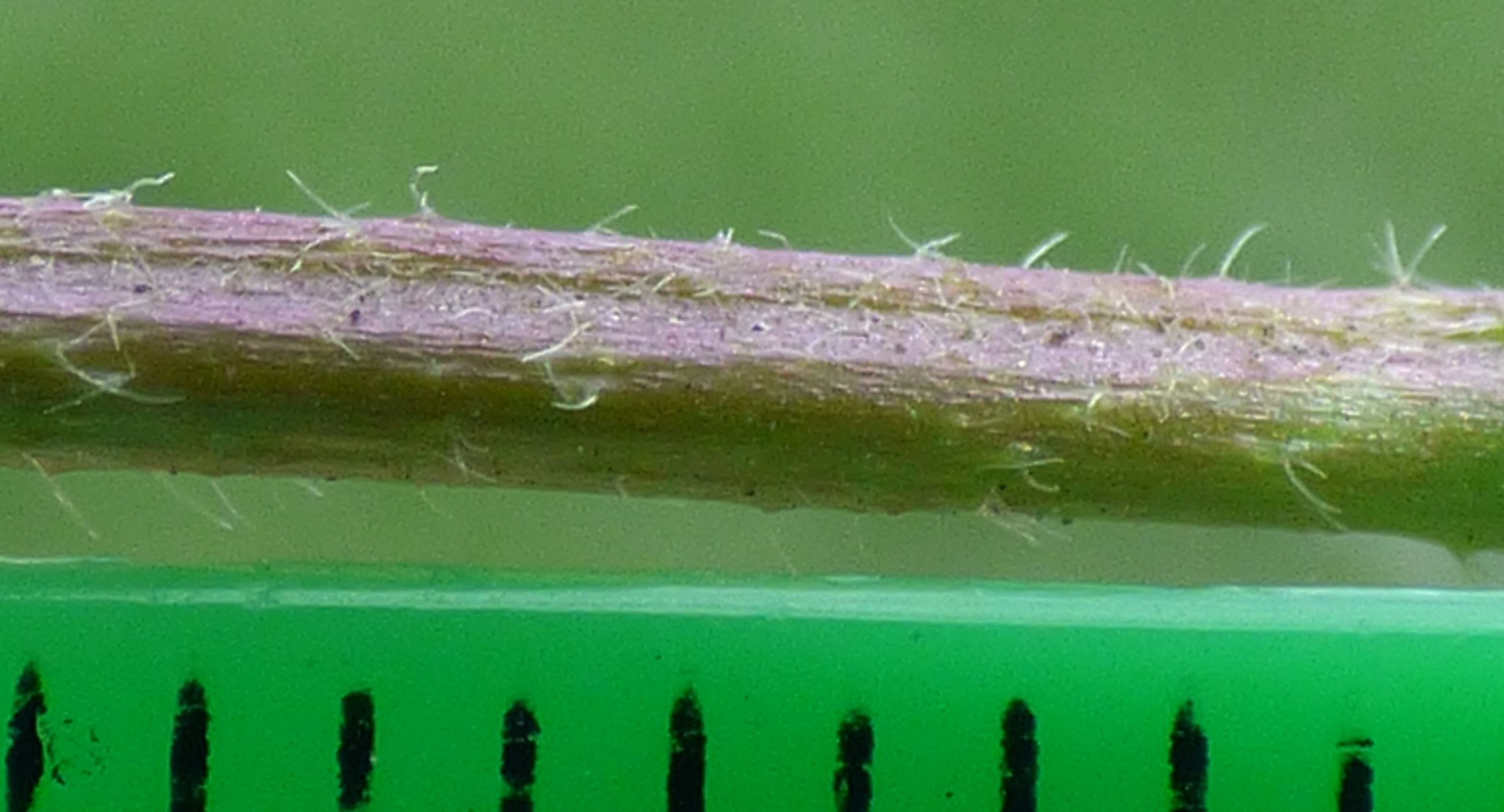
Hairs a mixture of stellate (star-like) and simple

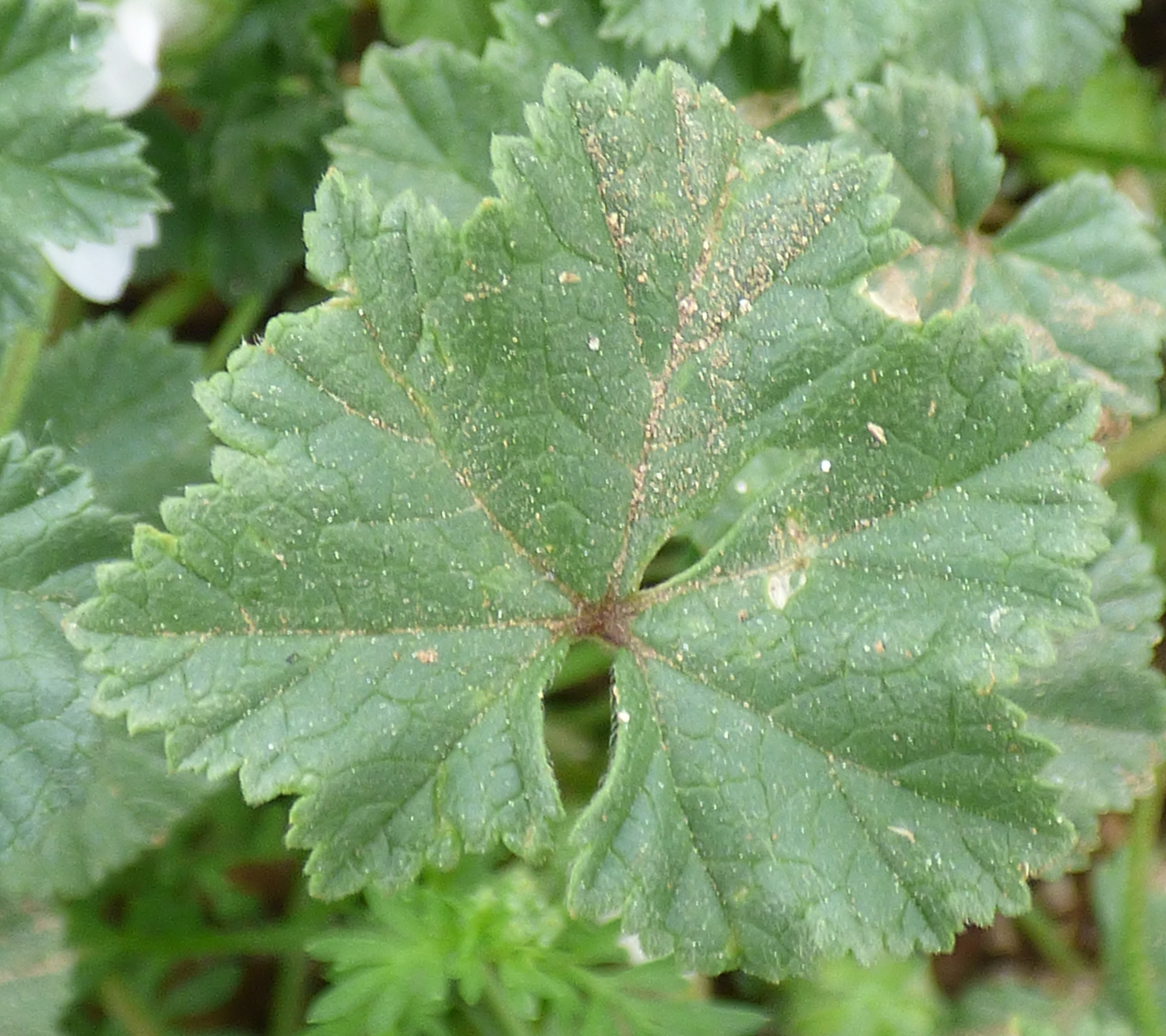
Leaf

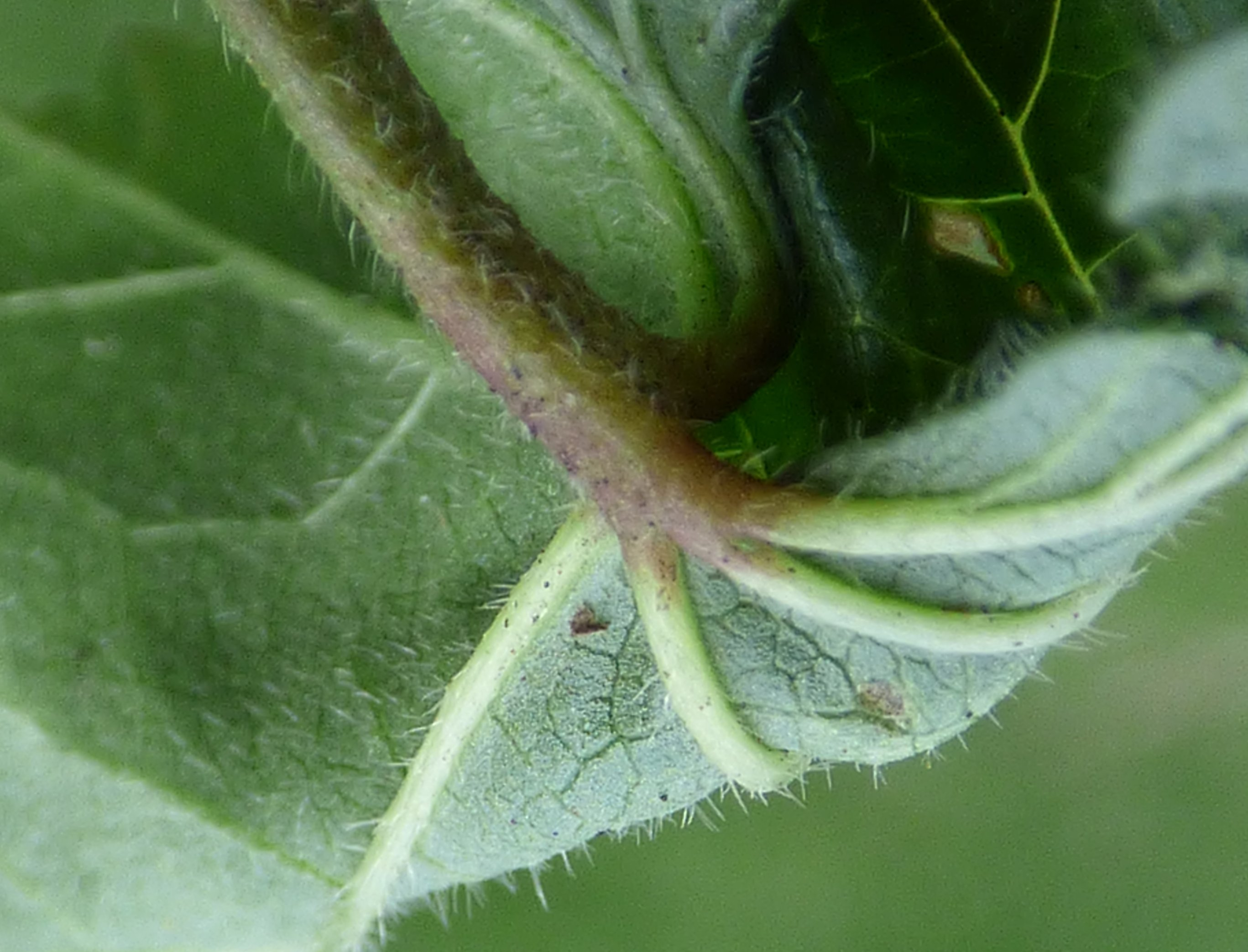
Leaf underside

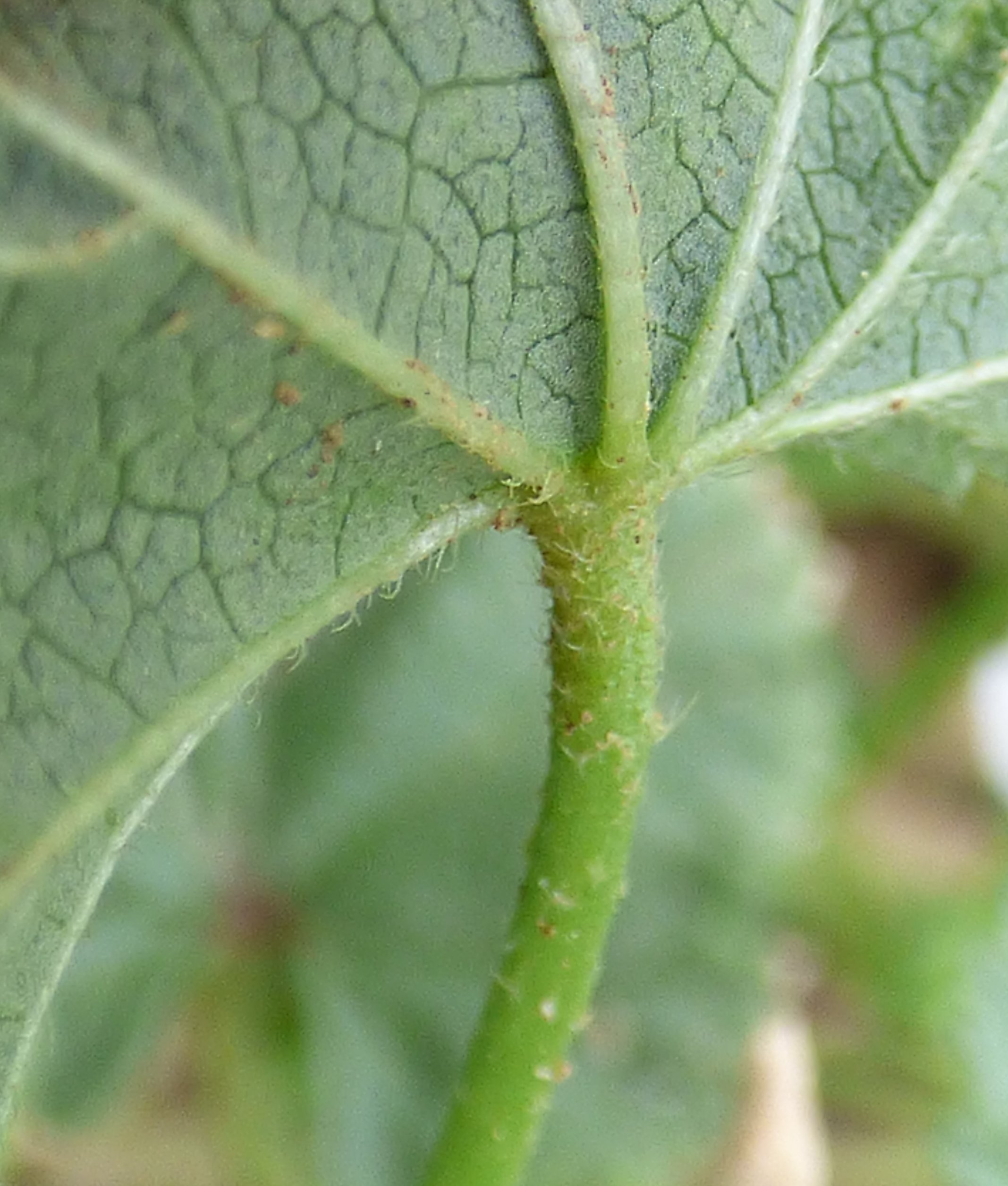
Leaf underside
