= Nottingham Arabidopsis Stock Centre =

- Website: https://arabidopsis.info

The Nottingham Arabidopsis Stock Centre (NASC) provides seed and information resources to the International Arabidopsis Genome Project and the wider research community. It is based in the School of Biosciences at the University of Nottingham's Sutton Bonington Campus, in the English county of Nottinghamshire.

It holds more than 800,000 different stocks of seed representing nearly a million genotypes and provided a Genechip service from 2002-2013. Newly generated research stocks, mutants or lines of Arabidopsis thaliana are donated as samples to NASC where they are maintained and thus are made available to scientists worldwide.

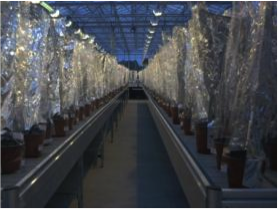
Main regeneration glasshouses at NASC holding ~10,000 stocks in each cycle.

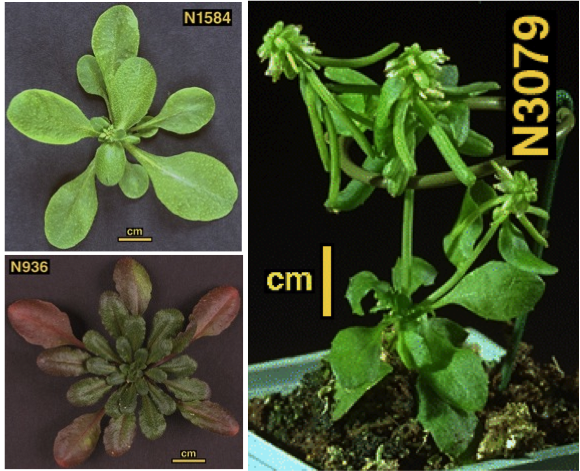
Photographs of example arabidopsis ecotypes (left) and a mutant line (right) taken within NASC from real stocks available to the scientific public.

Established in 1990 as part of the Plant Molecular Biology initiative of the Agricultural and Food Research Council (AFRC), the Centre is currently funded by the Biotechnology and Biological Sciences Research Council (BBSRC) and the University of Nottingham.

The Stock Centre was founded by Dr Bernard Mulligan; Directed from 1991 to 1999 by Dr Mary Anderson and from 1999–present by Prof. Sean Tobias May.

NASC's activities are coordinated with those of the Arabidopsis Biological Resource Center, (ABRC) based at Ohio State University, USA. This facilitates a unified and efficient service for the research community.

The stock centres have a distribution agreement. NASC distributes to Europe and ABRC distributes to the Americas. Laboratories in other locations may establish their primary affiliation with either centre.

When NASC started in 1990 it inherited hundreds of stocks from the Arabidopsis Information Service (AIS) - Started by Robbelen in 1965 and continued by Burger (1971), Kranz (1978), and Kranz and Kirchheim (1981, 1987), the AIS donated its complement of stocks listed in the 24th edition of the AIS stock book. Stock numbers held at NASC/ABRC in the 1990s then increased steadily by many hundreds mainly due to new technologies of mass transformation (e.g. seed transformation by Ken Feldmann, University of Arizona); but also due to many new mutagenesis programs encouraged by the development of Arabidopsis as a major model organism accompanied by generous donations of seed from many international members of the community.

In 1999 NASC received a large influx of thousands of stocks generated through T-DNA transformation and donated by Pelletier and Bechtold from INRA. This was the first of many very large populations that came out of the community and which took the complement of stocks held by the stock centres into the hundreds of thousands. The largest (most populous) seed donations have been the GABI-kat lines from Germany via Bernd Weisshaar; and the SALK lines from Joe Ecker. Between them, these two populations account for more than half of all stocks held by the stock centres today.
