= Abscisic aldehyde =

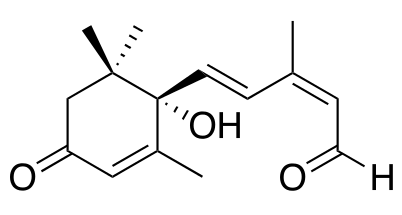

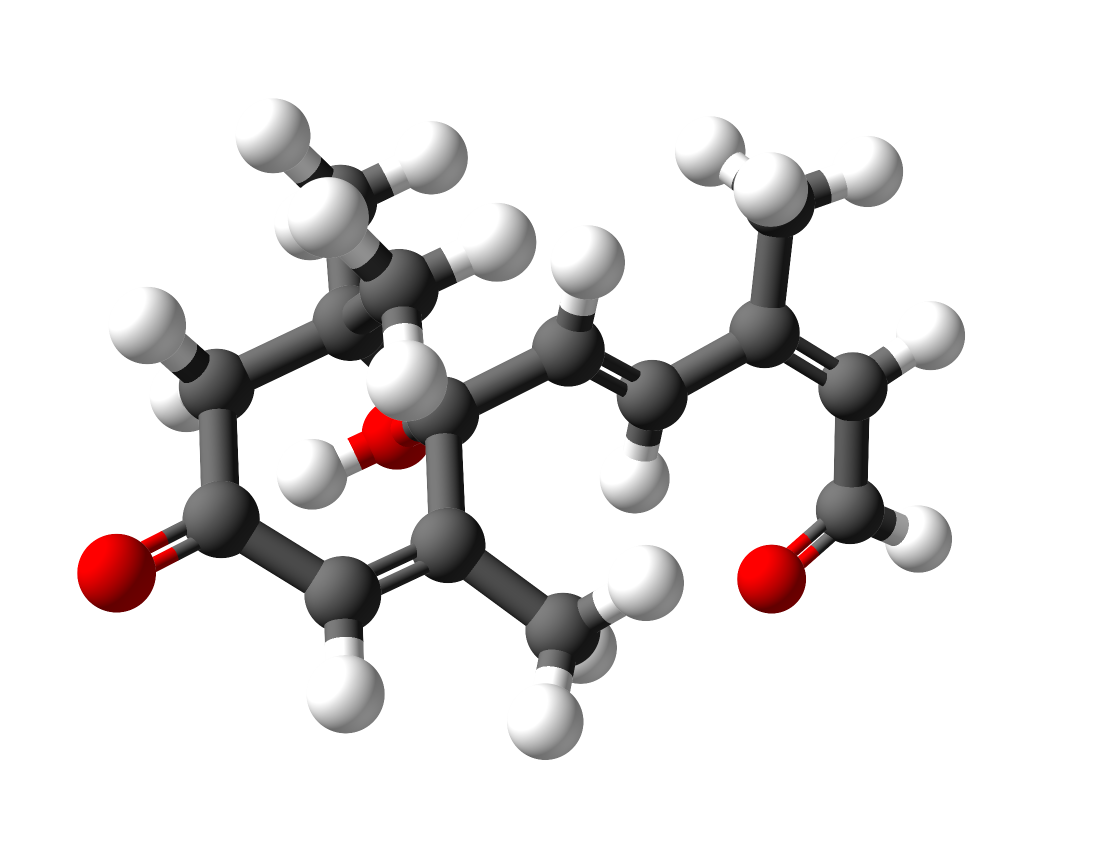

Names
- Preferred IUPAC name (2Z,4E)-5-[(1S)-1-Hydroxy-2,6,6-trimethyl-4-oxocyclohex-2-en-1-yl]-3-methylpenta-2,4-dienal
- Other names Abscisyl aldehyde

Identifiers
CAS Number	41944-86-9
3D model (JSmol)	Interactive image
ChEBI	CHEBI:31157
ChemSpider	4445405
KEGG	C13455
PubChem CID	5282224
UNII	BDU56T3CXY
CompTox Dashboard (EPA)	DTXSID101045385
- InChI: InChI=1S/C15H20O3/c1-11(6-8-16)5-7-15(18)12(2)9-13(17)10-14(15,3)4/h5-9, 18H,10H2,1-4H3/b7-5+,11-6-/t15-/m1/s1 Key: RIKWDZWVHUIUAM-KICRZJJPSA-N
- SMILES: CC1=CC(=O)CC([C@]1(/C=C/C(=C\C=O)/C)O)(C)C

Properties
Chemical formula	C_{15}H_{20}O_{3}
Molar mass	248.322 g·mol^{−1}
- Except where otherwise noted, data are given for materials in their standard state (at 25 °C [77 °F], 100 kPa). Infobox references

Abscisic aldehyde is an intermediate in the biosynthesis of the plant hormone abscisic acid. It is produced by the dehydrogenation of xanthoxin by xanthoxin dehydrogenases, which is an NAD+ dependent short-chain dehydrogenase, followed by selective oxidation by abscisic aldehyde oxygenase.
