= Xanthoxin =

Names
- Systematic IUPAC name (2Z,4E)-5-[(1S,4S,6R)-4-hydroxy-2,2,6-trimethyl-7-oxabicyclo[4.1.0]heptan-1-yl]-3-methylpenta-2,4-dienal
- Other names Xanthoxal

Identifiers
CAS Number	8066-07-7
3D model (JSmol)	Interactive image
ChEBI	CHEBI:32304
ChemSpider	4445403
ECHA InfoCard	100.029.547
PubChem CID	5282222
UNII	390CLE3JBK
CompTox Dashboard (EPA)	DTXSID601035303
- InChI: InChI=1S/C15H22O3/c1-11(6-8-16)5-7-15-13(2,3)9-12(17)10-14(15,4)18-15/h5-8,12,17H,9-10H2,1-4H3/b7-5+,11-6-/t12-,14+,15-/m0/s1 Key: ZTALKMXOHWQNIA-TVBSHJCBSA-N
- SMILES: C[C@]12C[C@@H](O)CC(C)(C)[C@]2(/C=C/C(/C)=C\C=O)O1

Properties
Chemical formula	C_{15}H_{22}O_{3}
Molar mass	250.338 g·mol^{−1}
Density	1.15 g/mL
Boiling point	371.1 °C (700.0 °F; 644.2 K)
- Except where otherwise noted, data are given for materials in their standard state (at 25 °C [77 °F], 100 kPa). verify (what is ?) Infobox references

Xanthoxin is an intermediate in the biosynthesis of the plant hormone abscisic acid.
