= List of cassava diseases =

This article is a list of diseases of cassava (Manihot esculenta).

== Bacterial and Phytoplasma diseases ==
Bacterial and mycoplasma-like diseases
| Antholysis | Phytoplasma (Candidatus Phytoplasma spp.) |
| Witches' broom | Phytoplasma (Candidatus Phytoplasma spp.) |
| Bacterial blight | Xanthomonas axonopodis pv. manihotis |
| Bacterial angular leaf spot | Xanthomonas campestris pv. cassavae |
| Bacterial stem gall | Agrobacterium tumefaciens Biovar 1 |
| Bacterial stem rot | Erwinia carotovora subsp. carotovora |
| Bacterial wilt | Erwinia herbicola (syn. Pantoea agglomerans) |

== Fungal diseases ==
Fungal diseases
| Anthracnose | Colletotrichum gloeosporioides = Colletotrichum gloeosporoides f.sp. manihotis Glomerella cingulata [teleomorph] Colletotrichum graminicola Glomerella graminicola [teleomorph] |
| Armillaria root rot (shoestring root rot) | Armillaria mellea Rhizomorpha subcorticalis [anaomorph] |
| Black root and stem rot | Scytalidium spp. Hendersonula toruloidea [syanamorph] |
| Blight leaf spot | Cercospora vicosae |
| Brown leaf spot | Cercosporidium henningsii Mycosphaerella henningsii [teleomorph] |
| Cassava ash | Oidium manihotis |
| Concentric ring leaf spot | Phyllosticta manihotae P. manihoticola |
| Dematophora root rot (Rosellinia root rot) | Dematophora necatrix Rosellinia necatrix [teleomorph] |
| Diplodia root and stem rot | Diplodia manihoti |
| Fusarium root rot | Fusarium oxysporum F. solani Nectria haematococca [teleomorph] |
| Rigidopurus root rot | Rigidoporus microporus = Rigidoporus lignosus |
| Rust | Uromyces spp. |
| Sclerotium root rot (southern blight) | Sclerotium rolfsii Athelia rolfsii [teleomorph] |
| Superelongation | Sphaceloma manihoticola Elsinoë brasiliensis [teleomorph] |
| Verticillium root and stem rot | Verticillium dahliae |
| White leaf spot | Phaeoramularia manihotis |

== Oomycete diseases ==
Oomycete diseases
| Phytophthora root rot | P. cryptogea P. drechsleri P. erythroseptica P. nicotianae var. parasitica |
| Pythium root rot | Pythium spp. |

== Miscellaneous diseases and disorders ==
Miscellaneous diseases and disorders
| Post-harvest root rot | Physiologic and pathogenic deteriorations |
| Root smallpox disease | Microbial rotting after feeding by Cyrtomenus bergi |

== Viral diseases ==
Viruses are a severe problem in the tropics. Viruses were the primary reason for the lack of cassava yield increases from the late 1990s to 2019.

Viral diseases
| African cassava mosaic | African cassava mosaic virus (ACMV) |
| Cassava brown streak disease | Cassava brown streak virus (CBSV) |
| Cassava common mosaic | Cassava common mosaic virus (CsCMV) |
| Cassava frogskin | Cassava Frogskin-Associated Virus (CsFSaV) |
| Cassava green mottle | Cassava green mottle virus (CGMV) |
| Cassava symptomless infections | Cassava American latent virus (CsAlV) Cassava Ivorian bacilliform virus (CIBV) |
| Cassava vein mosaic | Cassava vein mosaic virus (CsVMV) |
| Indian cassava mosaic | Indian cassava mosaic virus (ICMV) |
