= Elijah Ateka =

Kenyan plant physiologist and researcher

Elijah Miinda Ateka
- Education: University of Nairobi
- Scientific career
- Workplaces: Jomo Kenyatta University of Agriculture and Technology
- Thesis: Biological and molecular characterisation of potyviruses infecting sweet potato (2005)

Elijah Miinda Ateka (born 20 August 1972) is a Professor of Plant Virology at the Jomo Kenyatta University of Agriculture and Technology. He is involved with the diagnosis and characterisation of the sweet potato virus and the cassava virus, and is part of the Cassava Virus Action Project (CVAP).

== Early life and education ==
Ateka attended Menyenya High School in Kenya. Ateka studied agriculture at the University of Nairobi and graduated in 1995. He remained there for his graduate studies, earning a Master's degree in plant pathology in 1999 and a PhD in molecular virology in 2005. He worked under the supervision of Rose W. Njeru. During his PhD Ateka worked at the Biologische Bundesanstalt für Land- und Forstwirtschaft. He has worked as a Visiting Researcher at Nagoya University, as well as in the Kenyan Ministry of Agriculture. Ateka joined the Kenya Agricultural & Livestock Research Organisation, where he studied sweet potato viruses including feathery mottle, leaf curl and mild mottle virus. De:Biologische Bundesanstalt fur Land- und Forstwirtschaft De:Biologische Bundesanstalt für Land- und Forstwirtschaft

== Research and career ==
Ateka joined the Jomo Kenyatta University of Agriculture and Technology in 2006. He is involved with the monitoring of crops in east Africa, including cassava, tomato and sweet potato. Cassava is a plant with a tuberous root that it extensively cultivated in Africa. It is a staple food of the developing world and the third largest source of carbohydrates in the tropics. Unfortunately, Cassava plants are susceptible to circular single-stranded DNA viruses transmitted by whitefly. Ateka has been involved with chemotherapy and thermotherapy trials to eliminate the Cassava mosaic virus. He opened a new diagnostic facility and greenhouse in 2017. Ateka was the Country Team Leader for the Bill & Melinda Gates Foundation grant Cassava Disease Diagnostics; one of the first programs run by and for people in East Africa.

Ateka works with Boykin at the University of Western Australia on the characterisation and diagnosis of viruses that impact the Cassava plant. He has been involved with training programmes for African farmers and researchers, leading collaborative courses with Jomo Kenyatta University of Agriculture and Technology and University of Eldoret. The programmes were supported by the Crawford Fund, and included the development of portable DNA sequencers (nanopore) to help farmers diagnose their crops early. During the project, the researchers identify the DNA sequence of the Cassava, a process which can generate up to 5 Gb of data. In 2019 Ateka and Boykin launched the KENET’s Virtual Lab, a high-speed data transfer platform to share information between Kenya and Australia. The collaboration has saved the researchers having to travel long distances to exchange data. He is developing a new breed of cassava that is more resilient to climate change; including drought, heat and cold.

Ateka has worked as an advisor for the United Nations.

== Personal life ==
Ateka is married to Azenath N. Ateka, with whom he has three children.
