= Laura Boykin =

American computational biologist and botanist

Laura Boykin Okalebo
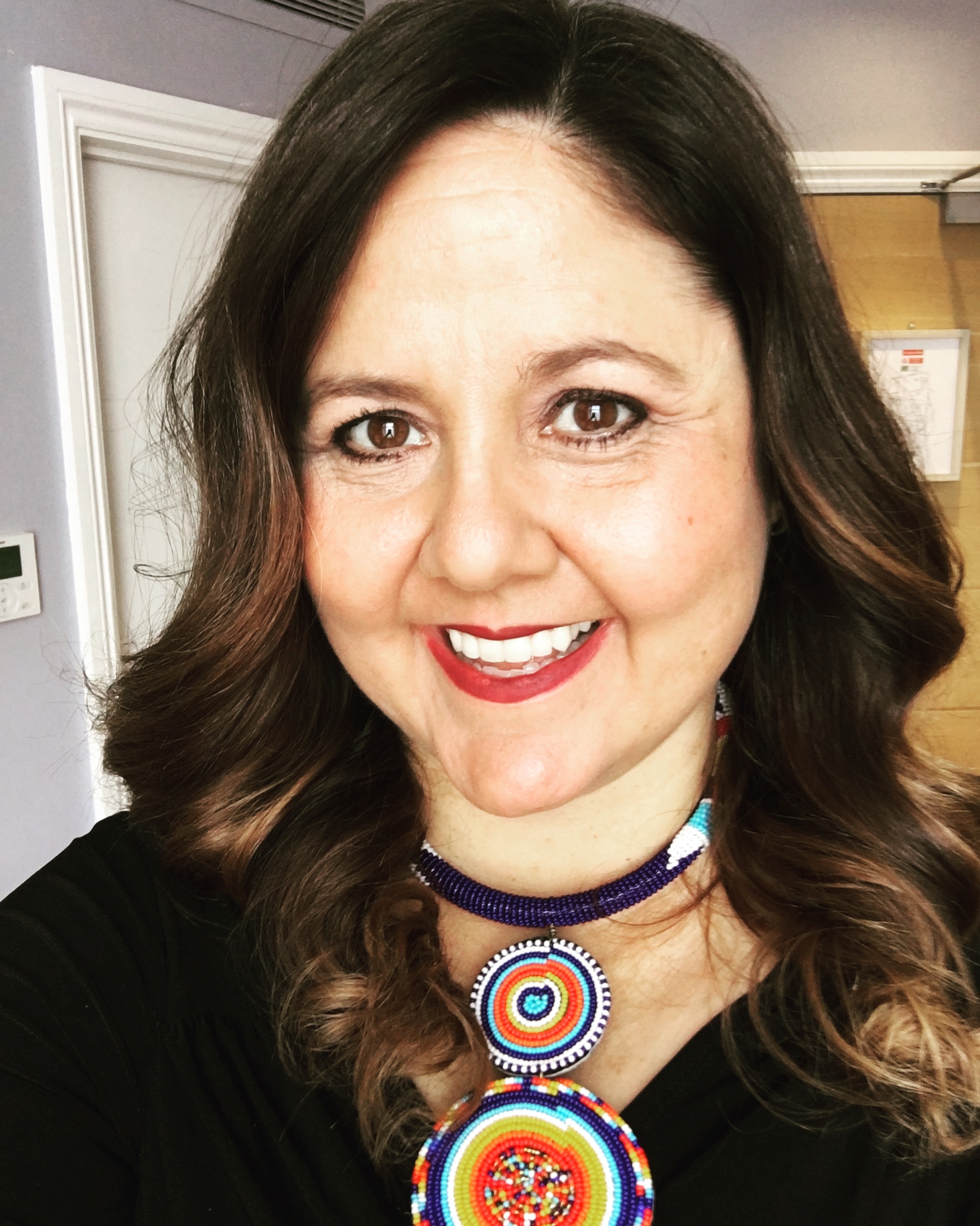
- Education: Occidental College; San Francisco State University; University of New Mexico
- Awards: TED fellow (2017)
- Scientific career
- Workplaces: University of Western Australia; United States Department of Agriculture

Laura Boykin Okalebo is an American computational biologist who uses supercomputing and genomics to help farmers in Sub-Saharan Africa. She has studied the evolution of the agricultural pest whitefly and identified genetic differences between various species. She works with African scientists to develop computing and genomics skills across the continent, and is a Senior TED fellow.

== Early life and education ==
Boykin grew up with her mother, who worked at Phoenix Suns basketball games to pay Boykin's way through college. She studied biology at Occidental College, where she worked on the chaparral shrub Arctostaphylos parryana. She moved to San Francisco State University for her Master's studies, working with Bob Patterson on a phylogenetic analysis of Arctostaphylos. She earned her PhD in 2003 at the University of New Mexico, where she worked in the Los Alamos National Laboratory theoretical biology research group. Here she learned how to use a supercomputer, analysing sequence data of influenza and hepatitis C in an effort to provide information for Centers for Disease Control and Prevention (CDC) vaccines. Boykin moved to the United States Department of Agriculture in Florida, where she began to investigate whiteflies. At the time, Europe limited the importation of flowers from Florida because of concerns about whiteflies. After completing her postdoctoral research, Boykin taught science at Jensen Beach High School. In 2009 Boykin moved to Lincoln University, where she worked in the Bio-Protection Research Centre.

== Research and career ==
Since 2012, Boykin Okalebo has been a senior researcher in the Australian Research Council Plant Energy Biology group at the University of Western Australia. She became interested in Africa as whiteflies native to the continent represent the base of their evolutionary tree, and after attending a Bill & Melinda Gates Foundation workshop that visited a smallholding farm in Kenya seriously impacted by them. She works with African researchers to use genomics and supercomputers to improve their ability to understand and tackle insect outbreaks. The portable DNA sequencing devices that she introduced to Africa have been helping fight crop disease since 2017.

In an effort to establish the causes of the devastation of cassava crops, Boykin Okalebo investigates the various whitefly in Sub-Saharan Africa. Worldwide, over 700 million people a day depend on cassava for their daily calories. Whiteflies transmit two viruses that are lethal for cassava; the cassava mosaic virus and cassava brown streak virus disease. These viruses are contained in Tanzania, Uganda, Malawi, Zimbabwe and Mozambique. In particular, Boykin Okalebo is interested in the Bemisia tabaci (silverleaf whitefly), which plague East Africa. She works with the Mikocheni Agricultural Research Institute (Tanzania), the Department of Agricultural Research & Technical Services (Malawi) and the National Crops Resources Research Institute (Uganda) in the Cassava Virus Action Project (CVAP). Boykin Okalebo works directly with Joseph Ndunguru, an African scientist who has brought biotechnology to Africa. CVAP used the Pawsey Supercomputing Centre to identify that the whitefly is actually a species complex of over 34 different species. The work of Boykin Okalebo and her Cassava warriors has resulted in a yield increase of over 800% for the cassava plant. Boykin Okalebo created WhiteFlyBase, a space to share data about whitefly species.

Boykin Okalebo was appointed a Senior TED fellow in 2017. She delivered her first TED Talk, Why Cassava is a Poverty Fighter, in Perth in 2016, but has also appeared on the main TED stage discussing the African Cassava Whitefly Project in Vancouver. She was made a Gifted Citizen in 2017. She was part of Science Foo Camp in 2019.
