= Sweet potato yellow dwarf virus =

Virus classification
- Group: Group IV ((+)ssRNA)
- Family: Potyviridae
- Genus: Ipomovirus
- Species: Sweet potato yellow dwarf virus (SPYDV)

Synonyms
- whitefly transmissible sweet potato virus

Species of virus

Sweet potato yellow dwarf virus (SPYDV) is a plant pathogenic virus of the family Potyviridae.
