= Longan witches broom-associated virus =

Virus classification
- (unranked): Virus
- Realm: Riboviria
- Kingdom: Orthornavirae
- Phylum: Pisuviricota
- Class: Stelpaviricetes
- Order: Patatavirales
- Family: Potyviridae
- Genus: incertae sedis
- Species: Longan witches broom-associated virus

Member viruses
- longan witches' broom-associated virus
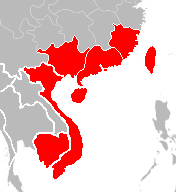
- Nations and subnational regions in China within which Longan witches broom-associated virus occurs (red)

Species of virus

Genomic information
- NCBI ID: GCF_002163385.1
- Genome size: 9428 nucleotides
- Year of completion: 2017

Longan witches broom-associated virus (LWBD or LWBaV) is a species of positive-sense single-stranded RNA virus that has not been assigned to a genus within the family Potyviridae. It is thought to be the cause of witch's broom in longan (Dimocarpus longan), a large tropical tree from southeastern Asia of economic value. Longan witches broom disease is a condition that was first described in 1941. The virus was found in symptomatic plants and absent in healthy plants, but not all of Koch's postulates have been fulfilled.

== Names ==
The official name for the species of virus is Longan witches broom-associated virus, properly written in italics, capitalized, and with no apostrophe. Within the species, there is one noted member virus, longan witches' broom-associated virus, which is not italicized or capitalized, but does include the apostrophe. In Chinese it is called 龙眼鬼帚病毒 (Lóngyǎn guǐzhǒu bìngdú) or 龍眼之本鬼病者 (Lóngyǎn zhī běn guǐ bìng zhě). In Vietnamese the disease is called chổi rồng trên nhãn, chổi rồng hại nhãn, bệnh chùn ngọn, bệnh chổi sể, and bệnh hủi nhãn.

== Phylogeny ==
Longan witches broom-associated virus is not closely related to other members of the family Potyviridae. The genus it has the closest phylogenetic affinity to is Tritimovirus, but there is no support to include it in that or any other established genus, so its generic placement is incertae sedis (uncertain). Instead of comparing sequences of RNA nucleotides directly, transcribing the RNA nucleotide sequence into an amino acid sequence yields Rose yellow mosaic virus (RoYMV), the sole member of the monotypic genus Roymovirus, as the closest relative of LWBaV. Further study is needed to determine the precise relationship between RoYMV and LWBaV.

== Structure ==
Virions of Longan witches broom-associated virus are filamentous and average 730 nm in length (300–2,500 nm) and 14–16 nm wide. Inside is a 9,428 nucleotide (excluding the poly(A) tail) positive sense RNA genome with an open reading frame of 9,261 amino acids.

== Pathogenesis ==
=== Transmission ===
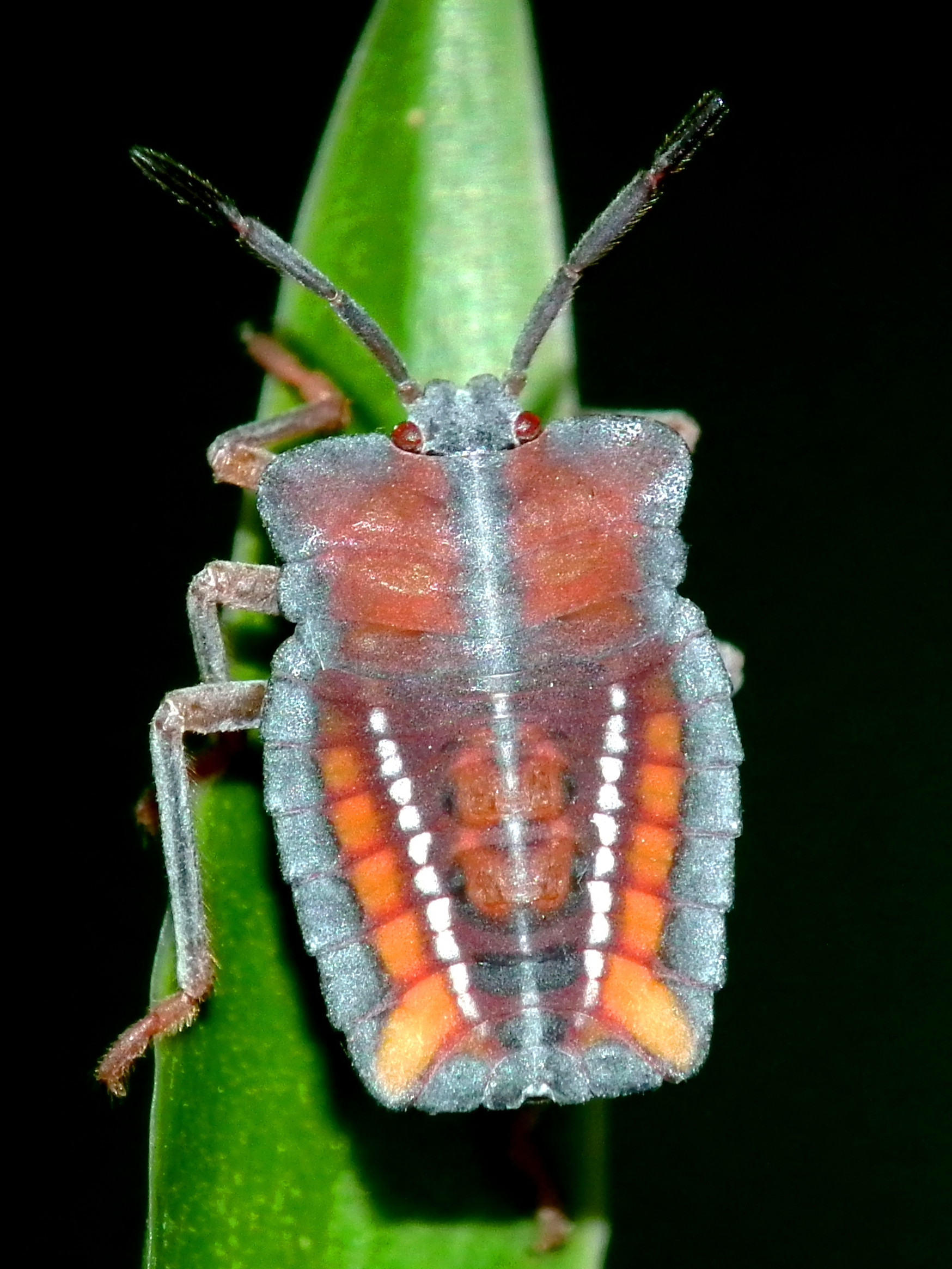
A litchi stink bug (Tessaratoma papillosa), one of the vectors of the disease

Grafting and seeds can spread the disease, so as early as 1955 the cause was thought to be a virus. A virus was found in diseased leaves in 1972, but the report was controversial because electromicrographs were not published and the results were not replicated for some time. This left the possibility that the cause was a species of phytoplasma, twig borer, or other organism. Treating seedlings with benzylpenicillin and tetracycline fails to stop the disease, indicating that phytoplasma are not the cause. Twig borers such as Adoxophyes cyrtosema, Conopomorpha sinensis, Crytophlebia ombrodelta, and Hypatima longanae were eliminated as possible vectors or causes as the disease will manifest on branches undamaged by these insects, and the disease will also be absent from damaged branches. A filamentous virus was isolated in 1990, with attributes similar to the one found in 1972.

The disease is spread by litchi stink bug (Tessaratoma papillosa, in the family Tessaratomidae) and longan psylla, (Cornegenapsylla sinica) and the virus was found in the salivary glands of those insects. Because of the insect vectors, it is possible the virus is related to one afflicting lychee, and can be spread to that species via grafting. Longan gall mite (Eriophyes dimocarpi) and the dodder Cuscuta campestris spreads the pathogen, as does infected pollen but not sap.

Similar to Rose yellow mosaic virus, the genome of LWBaV does not include conserved aphid transmission motifs, and thus is not thought to be transmitted by aphids. The planthopper Pyrops candelaria also does not seem to spread the pathogen.

Susceptible varieties of longan include 'Youtanben' (油潭本), 'Dongbi' (东壁), 'Honghezhi', and 'Pumingyan'. The cultivars 'Shuinan no. 1' and 'Lidongben' are highly resistant to LWBD. Fa Hok is susceptible, but more resistant than some others. Grafting with heat-treated or resistant scions is an effective way to reduce disease. However, it is also important to remove infected plant material and control for insect vectors. Application of miticides like omethoate, dicofol, or colloid sulphur can dramatically decrease the spread of the disease.

=== Range ===
The disease is found in Vietnam, Taiwan, China, and Cambodia. In China it is found in Hainan, Guangxi, Guangdong, Fujian, and Hong Kong. It was the first disease of longan ever reported in Hong Kong, and likely was introduced there from planting materials originating from Guangdong.

Afflicted trees can be 20–100% of a grove, with higher percentages found in more mature groves.

=== Symptoms ===
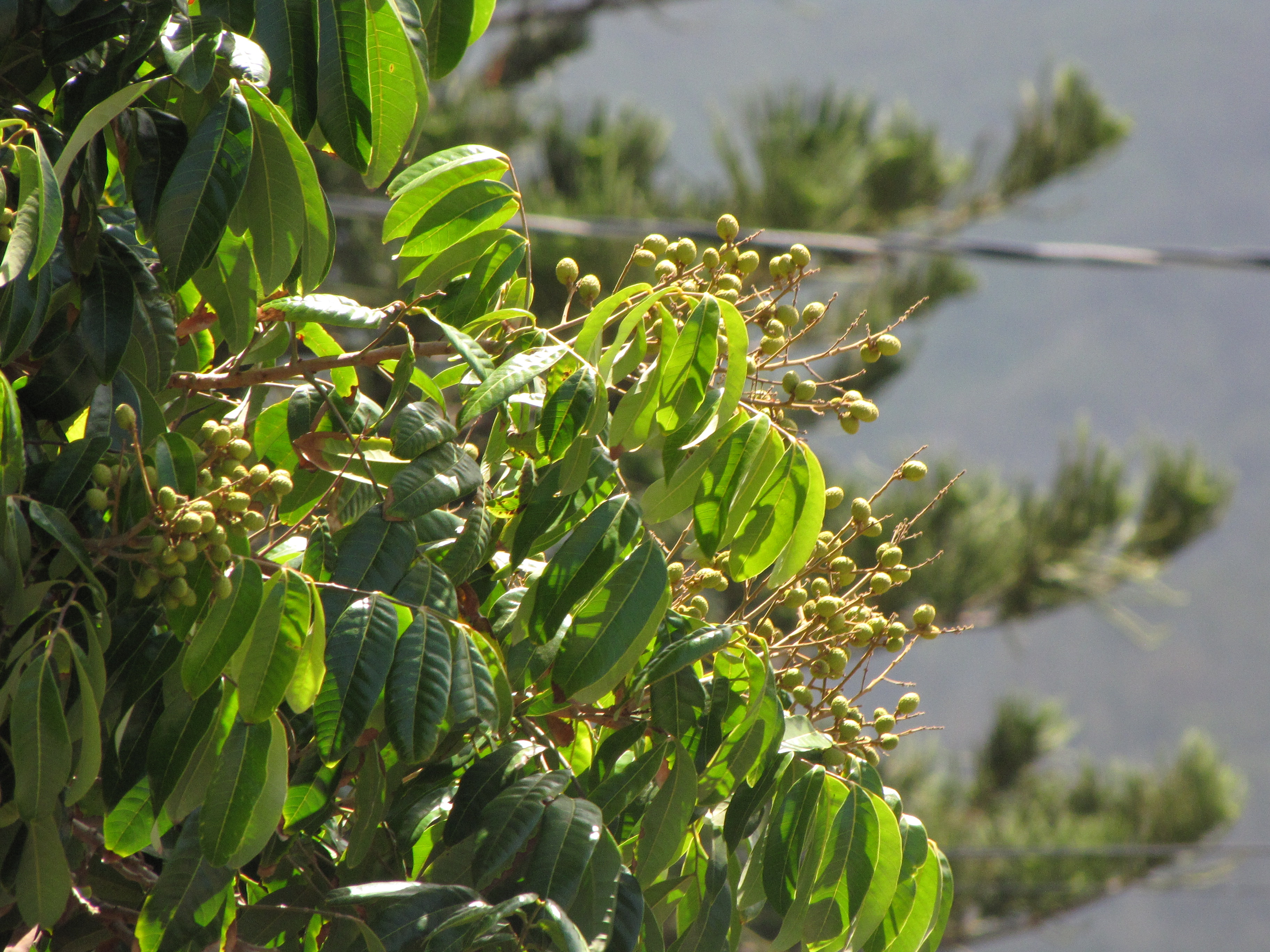
Healthy longan foliage

The disease stops young leaves from expanding and distorts mature leaves. Leaves may show vein clearing (yellowed veins), slight blistering, and necrosis. New leaves are smaller, duller, and have rolled margins. Infected leaves are crinkled, narrow, and typically fall off early. Under a microscope, infected affected bud leaflets may have longer trichomes (hairs), but this may be caused by co-infection with mites and not the virus itself. Infected branches have shoots that grow into dense clusters, which display the eponymous 'witches broom.' The inflorescences do not extend fully, resulting in distorted flowers with crowded panicles. The flowers then produce small, empty fruit if they do so at all. Otherwise the flowers prematurely fall off, leaving a feature looking like a broom. Younger trees typically display more symptoms than mature trees.

The virus is only found in the sieve tubes, typically associating with the cell membrane and cell walls and rarely in the lumen. Typically the virions will cluster and not be found singly.

Damage from twig borers such as Hypadima longanae can match the symptoms of LWBD.
