= Oat necrotic mottle virus =

Virus classification
- (unranked): Virus
- Realm: Riboviria
- Kingdom: Orthornavirae
- Phylum: Pisuviricota
- Class: Stelpaviricetes
- Order: Patatavirales
- Family: Potyviridae
- Genus: Tritimovirus
- Species: Tritimovirus avenae

Species of virus

Oat necrotic mottle virus (ONMV) is a plant pathogenic virus of the family Potyviridae.
