= CBSD =

CBSD may refer to:

- Cassava brown streak virus disease, a disease of cassava plants
- CBS Daytime, the daytime programming division of American media company CBS
- Central Bucks School District, a school district in Pennsylvania, United States
- Citizens Broadband Radio Service Device protocol, a Citizens Broadband Radio Service protocol
