= Chickpea bushy dwarf virus =

Chickpea bushy dwarf virus (CpBDV)

Virus classification
- Group: Group IV ((+)ssRNA)
- Family: Potyviridae
- Genus: Potyvirus
- Species: Chickpea bushy dwarf virus

Synonyms
- Chickpea bushy stunt virus

Species of virus

Chickpea bushy dwarf virus (CpBDV) is a plant pathogenic virus of the family Potyviridae. It was isolated and characterized from a chickpea in 1989 by a group of Indian researchers. Their researched indicated that the virus was sap-transmissible to 14 species of Chenopodiaceae, Leguminosae, Solanaceae and Malvaceae.
