= Oidium manihotis =

Scientific classification
- Kingdom: Fungi
- Division: Ascomycota
- Class: Leotiomycetes
- Order: Helotiales
- Family: Erysiphaceae
- Genus: Oidium
- Species: O. manihotis

Binomial name
- Oidium manihotis Henn.

Species of fungus

Oidium manihotis is a plant pathogen affecting cassava.

== See also ==
- List of cassava diseases
