= Brambyvirus =

Virus classification
- (unranked): Virus
- Realm: Riboviria
- Kingdom: Orthornavirae
- Phylum: Pisuviricota
- Class: Stelpaviricetes
- Order: Patatavirales
- Family: Potyviridae
- Genus: Brambyvirus

Genus of viruses

Brambyvirus is a genus of viruses, in the family Potyviridae. Plants serve as natural hosts. There is only one species in this genus: Blackberry virus Y (Brambyvirus rubi).

== Structure ==
Viruses in Brambyvirus are non-enveloped, with flexuous and filamentous geometries. The diameter is around 12-15 nm, with a length of 800 nm. Genomes are linear and non-segmented, around 11kb in length.

Genus	Structure	Symmetry	Capsid	Genomic arrangement	Genomic segmentation
Brambyvirus	Filamentous		Non-enveloped	Linear	Monopartite

== Life cycle ==
Viral replication is cytoplasmic. Entry into the host cell is achieved by penetration into the host cell. Replication follows the positive stranded RNA virus replication model. Positive stranded RNA virus transcription is the method of transcription. The virus exits the host cell by tubule-guided viral movement. Plants serve as the natural host. The virus is transmitted via a vector (unknown). Transmission routes are vector.

Genus	Host details	Tissue tropism	Entry details	Release details	Replication site	Assembly site	Transmission
Brambyvirus	Plants	None	Viral movement; mechanical inoculation	Viral movement	Cytoplasm	Cytoplasm	Mechanical inoculation: unknown vector
