= African cassava mosaic virus =

Virus classification
- (unranked): Virus
- Realm: Floreoviria
- Kingdom: Shotokuvirae
- Phylum: Cressdnaviricota
- Class: Repensiviricetes
- Order: Geplafuvirales
- Family: Geminiviridae
- Genus: Begomovirus
- Species: Begomovirus manihotis

Synonyms
- Cassava latent virus; Cassava mosaic virus; Cassava African mosaic virus

Species of virus

African cassava mosaic virus (ACMV) is a plant pathogenic virus of the family Geminiviridae that may cause either a mosaic appearance to plant leaves, or chlorosis (a loss of chlorophyll). In Manihot esculenta (cassava), the most produced food crop in Africa, the virus causes severe mosaic. Disease caused by ACMV is a significant concern in sub-Saharan Africa and the Indian subcontinent.

== Vectors ==
African cassava mosaic virus is vectord by a whitefly, Bemisia tabaci.

== Impact ==
ACMV and Cassava brown streak are the greatest drags on cassava in Africa. In surveys of 184 and 328 cassava farms in south-west and north-central Nigeria in 2015 and 2017, ACMV was detected in 79.1% and 54.8% of the cassava leaf samples analysed, while East African cassava mosaic virus was found in 6.0% and 4.7%.

== Control ==
A transgenic cassava with Tma12 donated from Tectaria macrodonta would protect against the whitefly vector.

== See also ==
- Cassava brown streak virus
