= Sweet potato mild mottle virus =

Virus classification
- (unranked): Virus
- Realm: Riboviria
- Kingdom: Orthornavirae
- Phylum: Pisuviricota
- Class: Stelpaviricetes
- Order: Patatavirales
- Family: Potyviridae
- Genus: Ipomovirus
- Species: Ipomovirus lenisbatatae

Synonyms
- sweet potato T virus; sweet potato B virus

Species of virus

Sweet potato mild mottle virus (SPMMV) is a plant pathogenic virus of the family Potyviridae.

== Host and symptoms ==
Sweet potato mild mottle virus (or SPMMV) has a large host range. This is uncommon for potyviruses, making SPMMV a divergent species of potyviruses. SPMMV hosts include 45 different species in 14 different plant families. The naturally occurring host, and namesake for the virus is Ipomoea batatas (sweet potato). Even though SPMMV is found naturally in sweet potato, scientists have been able to experimentally transmit the virus to different species including beets, sowbane, devil’s snare, makhmali, tomato, tobacco, petunia, and zinna.

Some common symptoms seen in SPMMV hosts include mild leaf mottling, which is characterized by irregular patterns of marks, patches, spots, and streaks of different colors on host leaves. Also, stunting and dwarfing of the plant is common. Some hosts even have venial chlorosis. Overall, plant growth is very poor in hosts with SPMMV.

== Environment ==
Sweet potato mild mottle virus is transmitted by Bemisia tabaci, which is the sweet potato whitefly. They are very small insects that suck in order to consume food. They are of the family Aleyrodidae of the order Homoptera.

The more time that the insect feeds on the crop, the higher chance they have of acquiring the plant virus. This will make it easier for them to transmit the virus to another plant, as they are persistent, circulative vectors. Whiteflies are mainly found in tropical areas, and have high populations in the warmer climates of the United States, Africa, and Australia.

== External links and references ==
- ICTVdB - The Universal Virus Database: Sweet potato mild mottle virus
- Family Groups - The Baltimore Method
