= Sweet potato leaf curl virus =

Virus classification
- (unranked): Virus
- Realm: Floreoviria
- Kingdom: Shotokuvirae
- Phylum: Cressdnaviricota
- Class: Repensiviricetes
- Order: Geplafuvirales
- Family: Geminiviridae
- Genus: Begomovirus
- Species: Begomovirus ipomoeae

Species of virus

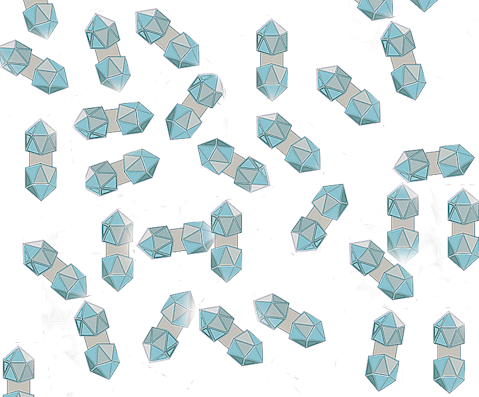
Illustrated image of Geminiviruses (the family SPLCV belongs to).

Sweet potato leaf curl virus is commonly abbreviated SPLCV. Select isolates are referred to as SPLCV followed by an abbreviation of where they were isolated. For example, the Brazilian isolate is referred to as SPLCV-Br.

Sweet potato leaf curl virus is one of more than 20 viruses known to infect the sweet potato. It is part of a group of sweet potato-infecting Begomoviruses generally known as "sweepoviruses". Viruses are common among sweet potatoes because their propagation is commonly dependent on stored roots or stems. Therefore, viruses can build up and have delayed emergence over the years. Viruses in sweet potatoes are problematic because they decrease crop yield and quality of storage roots. This is problematic as sweet potatoes are ranked seventh for global food crops.

Sweet potato leaf curl virus is commonly transmitted from insect to plant by whiteflies (Bemisia tabaci). Additionally, it can be transmitted from plant to plant via vegetative propagation, grafting, or the seeds. It is widely speculated that management of the whitefly population is essential to managing the spread of the SPLCV virus between infected and uninfected plants. In one case, the infection spread rapidly between plants within only two years of field planting.

== Structure ==
The virus is short, rod-shaped, and non-enveloped. The nucleocapsid has been measured at 38 nm long and 15-22 nm in diameter. Each nucleocapsid includes 22 capsomeres. Particles are two incomplete icosahedra joined together.

== Genome ==
The genome consists of 2.8 kb of circular single stranded DNA (ssDNA). Unlike the majority of virus genomes in the Begomovirus family which are bipartite, the SPLCV is monopartite. It contains only a single genomic component, which is similar to DNA-A of bipartite viruses. DNA-A typically encodes products for DNA replication, controls gene expression, and controls insect transmission. This suggests it is originally from the Old World. However, SPLCV (and other related sweepoviruses) are phylogenetically distinct from both Old World and New World Begomovirus groups. The genome contains six open reading frames (ORF). Two are located on virion sense strand which runs 3’ to 5’ (V1 and V2). The other four are located on complementary sense strand which runs 5’ to 3’ (C1, C2, C3, and C4). They are separated by an intergenic region (IR) which contains a conserved stem-loop sequence motif.

== Replication cycle ==
Virus particles enter the host cell and then the uncoated viral genome enters the nucleus of that cell. Within the nucleus, the viral genome is amplified and goes through the process of DNA replication.

=== Entry into cell ===
At this time, the mechanisms behind the entry of SPLCV into host cells are unclear.

=== Replication and transcription ===
One aspect of the replication process of the geminivirus (SPLCV genus) replication cycle includes the conversion of (-) viral ssDNA to (+) dsDNA intermediate. Many mechanisms of (-) DNA replication initiation in the SPLCV have been identified but this first step in the replication process is thought to be catalyzed by host factors. The presence of DNA primase along with polymerase activity has been noted as one method of replication initiation. During replication, (-) viral ssDNA is converted to (+) dsDNA intermediate upon activation of the (-) strand origin of DNA replication. As replication continues, elongation occurs in order to produce dsDNA followed by the production of covalently closed circular dsDNA.

During another aspect of SPLCV replication, supercoiled (ccc)dsDNA is converted into dsDNA and ssDNA by rolling-circle replication. Pivotal viral proteins have various effects on the replication and translation of SPLCV. All geminiviruses encode a REP protein, which is one protein that influences initiation of replication while also allowing for the continuation of replication past that point. The RepA protein contains three RCR conserved motifs and behaves similarly to the REP protein. The REn protein has been identified during this process but its role is currently unknown. Other proteins such as R2 and CP have been hypothesized to participate in the witch from the rolling circle to the ssDNA genomes.

TrAP is a 15-kDa transcriptional activator protein that is also called AC2 or AL2 and is unique to begomoviruses (SPLCV family). C2 is a related protein that was identified in the SPLCV replication and transcription processes but it is unclear what it accomplishes. TrAP is a required activation protein. Truncated mRNAs found in SPLCV cannot be spliced. They are able to be translated into the RepA protein. The RepA protein is necessary in the viral-sense transcription that results in the production of MP and CP. Termination mechanisms for SPLCV replication are present but their exact mechanics have yet to be identified.

=== Assembly and release ===
The Rep protein is responsible for termination. It cuts and releases newly synthesized ssDNA in order to create many copies of viral ssDNAs.

== Symptoms ==
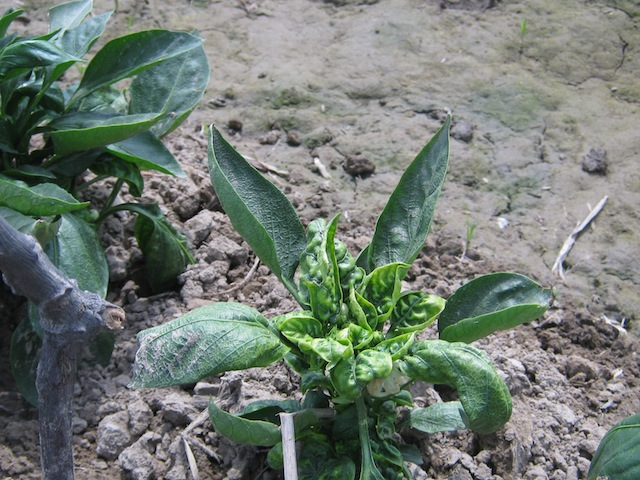
Leaf curl virus on Capsicum plant. Physical symptoms are synonymous in sweet potatoes.

The primary symptom of SPLCV includes upward leaf curling. This is primarily seen in young plants with SPLCV. As plants mature, it is common for visual symptoms to dissipate. Additional symptoms of SPLCV include seedling twisting, deformation of floral tissues, and reduction of pollen fertility and seed number. A common method for analyzing symptoms is through the use of PCR (Polymerase chain reaction).

Another symptom is stunted development of the anther and pollen. A C4 protein related to the SPLCV interacts with brassinosteroid-intensive 2 (ABtBIN2) in the plasma membrane of host cells. This results in the C4 protein re-localizing AtBIN2-interacting proteins in the nucleus of the host cell, altering the expression of brassinosteriod (BR)-genes to cause the activation of BR-signaling pathway. This causes the down-regulated expression of key genes that are necessary to the development of the anther and pollen.

SPLCV is most common in sweet potatoes, but symptoms have also been observed in blue morning glory (Ipomoea indica).

== Interaction with host ==
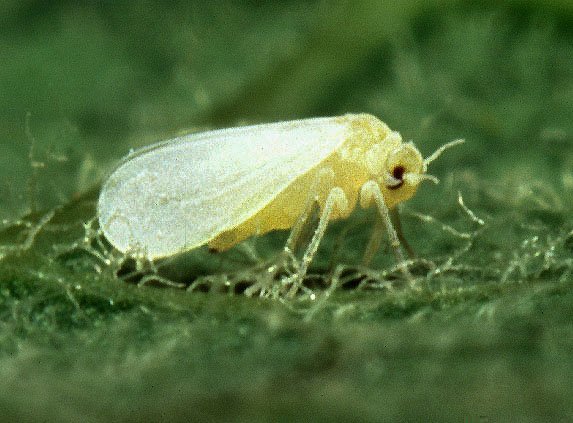
Main vector of SPLCV, the sweet potato whitefly (Bemisia tabaci).

The sweet potato whitefly (Bemisia tabaci) transmits over 100 plant viruses, one of these being SPLCV. Both male and female whiteflies have been shown to transmit SPLCV to a similar efficiency. Furthermore, the whiteflies do not carry the virus for life. Instead, they have been shown to carry it for a maximum of 35 days.

Transmission occurs in a persistent-circulative manner. Persistent refers to how the virus passes through the gut to the haemolymph, and then to the salivary glands. Circulative denotes that the virus cannot replicate in both the parent and the insect. SPLCV is protected inside the whitefly by a chaperone protein produced by symbionts. This protein is called symbionin.

== Control and prevention ==
Insecticides have been tested towards SPLCV prevention. A study in 2014 published in the Journal of Agricultural and Urban Entomology reported that insecticides were ineffective in decreasing whitefly populations, but they had a positive effect in decreasing SPLCV in about half of the sprayed plots.

In order to work toward controlling the spread of SPLCV, it is necessary to know the three conditions that result in insect-transmitted viruses spreading. These conditions include a source of the virus, an insect vector that is present, and an insect that moves about. In many cases, real-time polymerase chain reaction (PCR) techniques are used to determine whether SPLCV has been transmitted.

Whiteflies (Bemisia tabaci) have been identified as the vector for the SPLCV and it is hypothesized that the reduction in this population would result in a reduction of the SPLCV cases. It has been determined that decreased feeding or increased flight activity of the whiteflies (Bemisia tabaci) could interfere with the spread of SPLCV. This is one reasoning that generally backs up the use of insecticides.

Control of whitefly (Bemisia tabaci) vectors with insecticides has met with limited success in preventing the spread of virus diseases. In one study that spanned over two years, only 2 out of 36 plots used represented a decrease in the presence of whiteflies. Insecticides used in this particular study included imidacloprid, pyriproxyfen, acetamiprid, and pymetrozine. Due to the outcomes in this study as well as data gathered from similar studies, the consensus is that insecticides should not be depicted as a possible management approach for insects that infect sweet potatoes.

In an attempt control the spread of SPLCV neonicotinoids were introduced. However, this resulted in worldwide resistance due to extensive exposure. In addition to this, there are now many examples of a cross cross resistance with other insecticide classes. Generally, when insecticides are used in an attempt to control the spread of SPLCV, rather than resulting in a decrease in viral infection, the incidence of disease increased.

Despite previous evidence, it has also been reported that the chitin synthesis inhibitor, buprofezin, and the juvenile hormone analog, pyriproxyfen, when used along with neonicotinoids has been successful in managing the spread of SPLCV through whiteflies (Bemisia tabaci).

== Associated diseases ==
Sweet potato leaf curl virus is one of 322 species in the genus Begomovirus. It is most closely related to its isolates, distinguished by location. Some of the currently known isolates of SPLCV include:

- Sweet potato leaf curl virus Brazil (SPLCV-Br)
- Sweet potato leaf curl virus Puerto Rico
- Sweet potato leaf curl Canary virus (SPLCCaV)
- Sweet potato leaf curl China virus (SPLCV-CN)
- Sweet potato leaf curl Georgia virus (SPLCGV)
- Sweet potato leaf curl Guangxi virus
- Sweet potato leaf curl Henan virus
- Sweet potato leaf curl Lanzarote virus (SPLCLaV)
- Sweet potato leaf curl Sao Paulo virus
- Sweet potato leaf curl Sichuan virus 1
- Sweet potato leaf curl Sichuan virus 2
- Sweet potato leaf curl South Carolina virus (SPLCSCV)
- Sweet potato leaf curl Spain virus (SPLCESV)
- Sweet potato leaf curl Uganda virus (SPLCUV)

Additionally, SPLCV is related to other sweepoviruses. Sweepovirus refers to all Begomoviruses isolated from sweet potatoes and other Ipomoea species. Examples include Sweet potato Golden vein associated virus (SPGVaV), Sweet potato mosaic virus, Ipomoea leaf curl virus (ILCV), Sweet potato mild mottle virus (SPMMV).

== Tropism ==
The exact type of cell that SPLCV infects to cause disease is currently unclear.
