= Tritimovirus =

Virus classification
- (unranked): Virus
- Realm: Riboviria
- Kingdom: Orthornavirae
- Phylum: Pisuviricota
- Class: Stelpaviricetes
- Order: Patatavirales
- Family: Potyviridae
- Genus: Tritimovirus

Genus of viruses

Tritimovirus is a genus of viruses, in the family Potyviridae. Plants serve as natural hosts. There are six species in this genus.

== Taxonomy ==
The genus contains the following species, listed by scientific name and followed by the exemplar virus of the species:

- Tritimovirus arrhenatheri, Tall oatgrass mosaic virus
- Tritimovirus avenae, Oat necrotic mottle virus
- Tritimovirus bromi, Brome streak mosaic virus
- Tritimovirus eqlidense, Wheat Eqlid mosaic virus
- Tritimovirus triseti, Yellow oat-grass mosaic virus
- Tritimovirus tritici, Wheat streak mosaic virus

== Structure ==
Viruses in Tritimovirus are non-enveloped, with flexuous and filamentous geometries. The diameter is around 12-15 nm, with a length of 690-700 nm. Genomes are linear, monopartite or bipartite, and around 9.3-10.0kb in length.

Genus	Structure	Symmetry	Capsid	Genomic arrangement	Genomic segmentation
Tritimovirus	Filamentous		Non-enveloped	Linear	Segmented

== Life cycle ==
Viral replication is cytoplasmic. Entry into the host cell is achieved by penetration into the host cell. Replication follows the positive stranded RNA virus replication model. Positive stranded RNA virus transcription is the method of transcription. The virus exits the host cell by tubule-guided viral movement. Plants serve as the natural host. The virus is transmitted via a vector (mite). Transmission routes are vector and mechanical.

Genus	Host details	Tissue tropism	Entry details	Release details	Replication site	Assembly site	Transmission
Tritimovirus	Plants	None	Viral movement; mechanical inoculation	Viral movement	Cytoplasm	Cytoplasm	Mechanical inoculation: mites
