= Cassava Ivorian bacilliform virus =

Virus classification
- (unranked): Virus
- Realm: Riboviria
- Kingdom: Orthornavirae
- Phylum: Kitrinoviricota
- Class: Alsuviricetes
- Order: Martellivirales
- Family: Bromoviridae
- Genus: Anulavirus
- Virus: Cassava Ivorian bacilliform virus

Pathogenic virus

Cassava Ivorian bacilliform virus (CsIBV) is a pathogenic plant virus.

== Distribution ==
Found only in the Ivory Coast.
