= Joseph Ndunguru =

Joseph Nduguru
- Education: Sokoine University of Agriculture (BS), University of Zambia (MSc), University of Pretoria (PhD)
- Awards: Presidential medal award on Scientific Discoveries and Research Excellence (2012), Best National Agricultural Research Scientist (2011).
- Scientific career
- Fields: Biological Virology
- Workplaces: Mikocheni Agricultural Research Institute
- Thesis: Molecular characterization of cassava mosaic geminiviruses in Tanzania

Joseph Ndunguru is a Molecular Plant Virologist, working for the Ministry of Agriculture, Livestock and Fisheries in Tanzania at Mikocheni Agricultural Research Institute (MARI) in Mikocheni, as the Officer in Charge from 2012 to date. He is also the National Biotechnology Research Coordinator in Tanzania.

His research interest is to understand plant viruses at the molecular level, develop diagnostic tools, and develop management strategies for plant viruses of economically important crops in Africa.
