= Indian cassava mosaic virus =

Virus classification
- (unranked): Virus
- Realm: Monodnaviria
- Kingdom: Shotokuvirae
- Phylum: Cressdnaviricota
- Class: Repensiviricetes
- Order: Geplafuvirales
- Family: Geminiviridae
- Genus: Begomovirus
- Species: Begomovirus manihotisindianense

Synonyms
- Cassava Indian mosaic virus

Species of virus

Indian cassava mosaic virus (ICMV) is a plant pathogenic virus of the family Geminiviridae. It affects cassava (Manihot esculenta) in India and certain other countries. It is considered to be an invasive species.

== History ==
This virus was unknown in India before the introduction of cassava into the country by the Portuguese in the seventeenth century, nor has a similar virus been reported in the New World where cassava originated. It is possible that the virus is native to India, affecting some yet-to-be-identified plant host, with the virus later adopting cassava as its preferred host; once present in a crop, the virus can be spread from plant to plant by insects such as whitefly.

The virus was first noticed in India in 1942. Its incidence is higher in Tamil Nadu and Kerala, the states where most cassava is grown, and it is of little consequence elsewhere in the country. Depending on the cultivar and the time of year, losses in root yield can vary from negligible to 84%.

== Hosts ==
In India, the natural hosts of ICMV are Manihot esculenta and Manihot carthaginensis subsp. glaziovii. Additionally, Jatropha curcas shows mosaic symptoms similar to cassava infected by ICMV; affected leaves have been shown to react in ELISA bioassay trials to African cassava mosaic virus antiserum, but follow up with a DNA B probe has provided negative results. This mosaic disease may be a new strain of ICMV affecting J. curcas, a plant with a potential as a biofuel crop, and it may become necessary to develop virus-resistant clones.

== Symptoms ==
The foliage of the plant exhibits the main symptoms which are yellow or green mosaic patterns appearing on the leaves, mottling, contortion, mis-shapen leaves, distorted growing points, stunting of the plant, rosetting, dwarfing and reduction in the root system.

== Transmission ==
ICMV is not transmissible by seed, so cassava seedlings are initially healthy. However the crop is mainly planted by stem cuttings and these are often infected. The main vectors involved in transferring the virus between plants are whitefly, particularly the silverleaf whitefly (Bemisia tabaci). One strain of B. tabaci in India infests cassava, eggplant and tobacco, and transmits ICMV. A second biotype infests sweet potato, cotton, eggplant, tobacco and tomato but not cassava, and this seems incapable of transmitting ICMV. The spiralling whitefly, Aleurodicus dispersus, also colonises cassava in India but whether it has a role in transferring the virus remains unclear.
