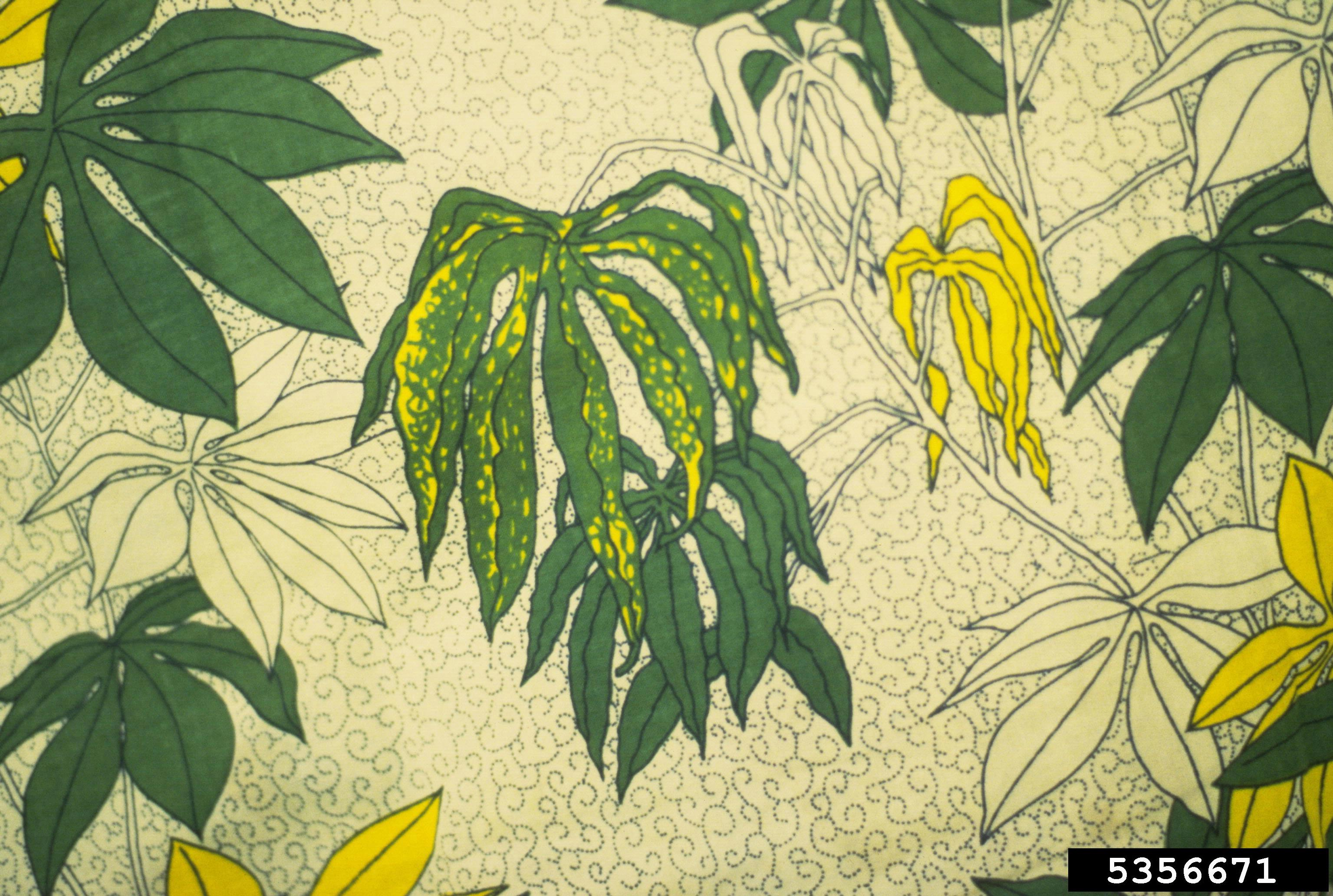
- Artistic rendering of symptoms of a cassava mosaic virus in Guinea-Bissau

Scientific classification
- (unranked): Virus
- Realm: Floreoviria
- Kingdom: Shotokuvirae
- Phylum: Cressdnaviricota
- Class: Repensiviricetes
- Order: Geplafuvirales
- Family: Geminiviridae
- Genus: Begomovirus

Groups included
- African cassava mosaic Burkina Faso virus; African cassava mosaic virus; Cassava mosaic Madagascar virus; East African cassava mosaic Cameroon virus; East African cassava mosaic Kenya virus; East African cassava mosaic Malawi virus; East African cassava mosaic virus; East African cassava mosaic Zanzibar virus; Indian cassava mosaic virus; South African cassava mosaic virus; Sri Lankan cassava mosaic virus

Cladistically included but traditionally excluded taxa
- All the other species of Begomovirus

= Cassava mosaic viruses =

Cassava mosaic virus

Genus of viruses

Cassava mosaic virus(es) is a collective name used to refer to one or more of eleven plant pathogenic viruses in the genus Begomovirus. African cassava mosaic virus (ACMV), East African cassava mosaic virus (EACMV), and South African cassava mosaic virus (SACMV) are distinct circular single-stranded DNA viruses which are transmitted by whiteflies and primarily infect cassava plants; these have thus far only been reported from Africa. Related viruses (Indian cassava mosaic virus, ICMV) are found in India and neighbouring islands (Sri Lankan cassava mosaic virus, SLCMV), though cassava is cultivated in Latin America as well as Southeast Asia. Eleven species of cassava-infecting geminiviruses have been identified between Africa and India based on genomic sequencing and phylogenetic analysis. The formal names of these species were changed to binomials (Begomovirus manihotis etc.) by ratification of proposal 2023.015P by the International Committee on Taxonomy of Viruses.

The viruses are members of the family Geminiviridae and the genus Begomovirus. The first report of cassava mosaic disease (CMD) was from East Africa in 1894. Since then, epidemics have occurred throughout the African continent, resulting in great economic loss and devastating famine. In 1971, a resistant line of cassava, the predominant host of the pathogen, was established and used by the International Institute of Tropical Agriculture in Nigeria. This resistance worked as an effective control for many years. However, in the late 20th century, a more virulent virus broke out in Uganda and quickly spread to East and Central Africa. This highly virulent strain was later discovered to be a chimaera of two distinct Begomovirus species.

CMD is primarily managed through phytosanitation practices as well as the use of conventional resistance breeding. Additionally, vector management and cross-protection help to minimize transmission and symptom development. Though management practices are useful, the viruses’ high rate of recombination and co-infection capabilities have caused CMD to be one of the most detrimental diseases affecting food supply in Africa.

== Hosts and symptoms ==
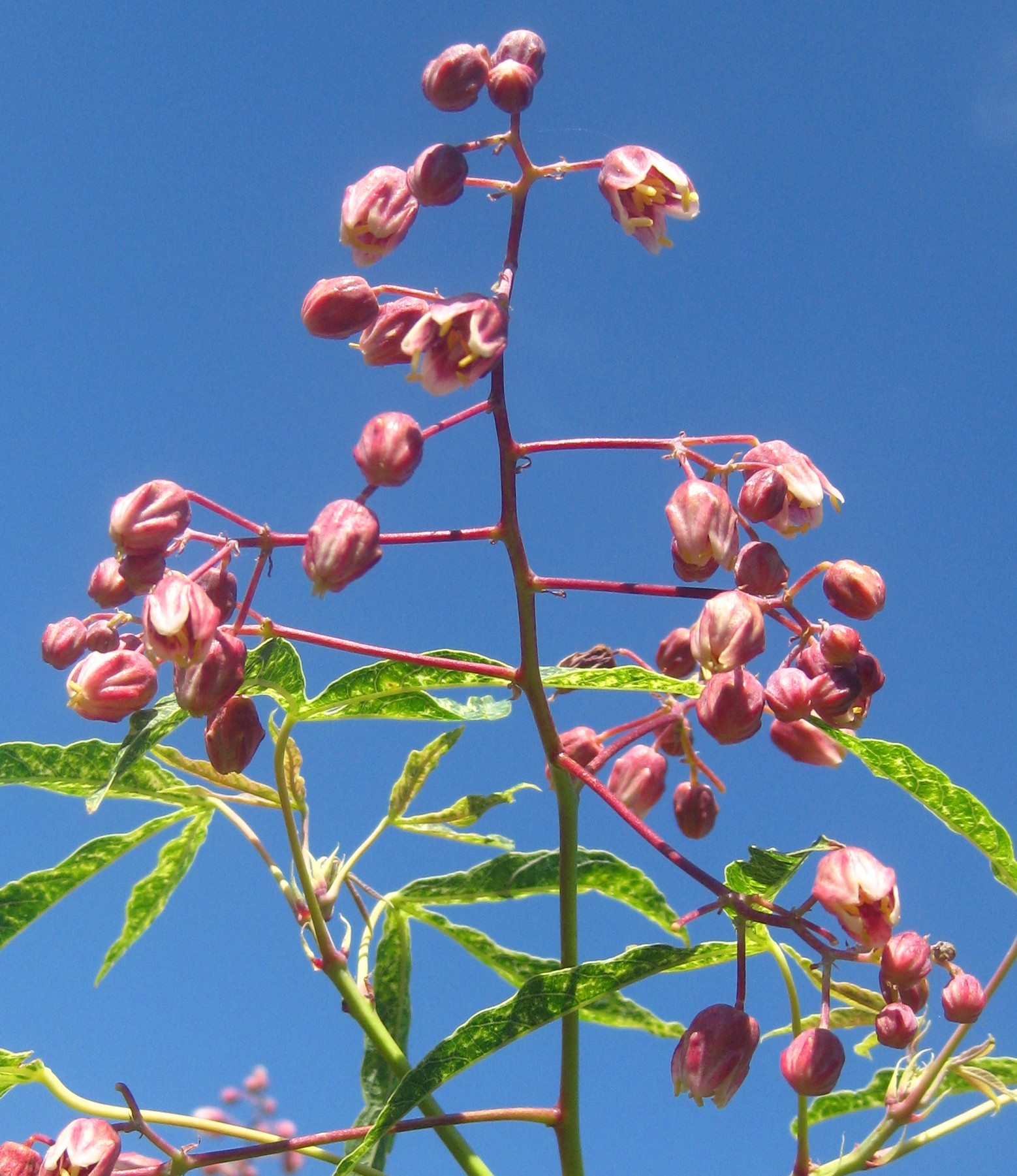
The inflorescence of cassava (Manihot esculenta, Family Euphorbiaceae), a tropical tuber crop. Muruwere, Manica Province of Mozambique. The leaves show symptoms of cassava mosaic disease, caused by a virus.

Cassava originated in South America and was introduced to Africa in relatively recent times. It is known to be a very drought-tolerant crop with the ability to yield even when planted in poor soils. When cassava was first grown in Africa, it was used for subsidiary purposes though it is now considered to be one of the most important food staple crops on the continent. Its production is moving toward an industrialized system in which plant material is used for a variety of products including starch, flour, and animal feed.

As cassava is vegetatively propagated, it is particularly vulnerable to viruses and thus Cassava geminiviruses lead to great economic loss each year. When these infect a host plant, the plant’s defense system is triggered. Plants use gene silencing to suppress viral replication, though begomoviruses have evolved a counter-acting suppressor protein against this natural host defense. Because different species of Begomovirus produce different variants of this suppressor protein, co-infection by multiple species typically leads to more severe disease symptoms.

Initially following infection of a cassava geminivirus in cassava, systemic symptoms develop. These symptoms include chlorotic mosaic of the leaves, leaf distortion, and stunted growth. Leaf stalks have a characteristic S-shape. Infection can be overcome by the plant especially when a rapid onset of symptoms occurs. A slow onset of disease development usually correlates with death of the plant. Besides the conventional effects of host and pathogen characteristics, soil fertility was first shown to affect symptomology by Mollard 1987.

Though the cassava-infecting geminiviruses causes most of their economic damage in cassava, they are able to infect other plants. The host range depends on the species of virus and most are able to be transmitted and to cause disease on plants of the genera Nicotiana and Datura.

Cassava Mosaic Disease is currently spreading across SE Asia.

== Causal agent and disease cycle ==
Cassava geminiviruses are transmitted in a persistent manner by the whitefly Bemisia tabaci, by vegetative propagation using cuttings from infected plants, and occasionally by mechanical means. Cassava produces its first leaves within 2–3 weeks of planting; these young leaves are then colonized by the viruliferous whiteflies. This is the key infection period for CMD geminiviruses, as they cannot infect older plants. As the genome of the viruses has two components, DNA A and B, that are encapsidated in separate geminate particles, it requires a double inoculation to cause infection.

Generally, whitefly requires 3 hours feeding time to acquire the virus, a latent period of 8 hours, after which it needs 10 minutes to infect the young leaves. There is variation in the literature on this score, however, with other sources citing a 4-hour acquisition time and 4-hour latent period. Symptoms appear after a 3-5 week latent period. Adult whiteflies can continue to infect healthy plants 48 hours after initial acquisition of the virus. A single whitefly is sufficient to infect the host; however, successful transmission increases when multiple infected whiteflies feed on the plant.

After entering the plant through the leaves, the virus remains in the leaf cells for 8 days. As it is a single-stranded DNA virus, it needs to enter the nucleus of the leaf cells to replicate. After this initial period, the virus enters the phloem and travels to the base of the stem and out into the branches. Travel to the branches of the plant is much slower than travel through the stem, so cuttings of branches from infected stems may be free of disease. Some literature has indicated that infection is limited to above-ground tissue, but it is not clear why this would be the case.

== Environment ==
The severity of cassava mosaic disease is impacted by environmental factors such as light intensity, wind, rainfall, plant density and temperature. Given that the viruses are transmitted by whitefly, the spread of the virus is going to depend largely on the vector. Temperature is the most important environmental factor controlling the size of the vector population. In the literature, vector-preferred temperature estimates vary from 20 °C to 30 °C to 27 °C to 32 °C but generally high temperatures associated with high fecundity, rapid development, and greater longevity in whitefly. Increased light intensity has been shown to increase activity of the whitefly vector.

Whiteflies can fly at speeds up to 0.2 mph, and in high-wind conditions they can move much greater distances in a shorter time, thus increasing rate of virus spread. This wind-dependent spread is reflected in the location of the whitefly in cassava fields, with populations greatest in upwind borders and lowest within the field.

Virus incidence increases when cassava is growing vigorously. Thus, plant density impacts the spread of the virus, with low-density fields encouraging faster disease propagation than high-density ones. In dry areas, rainfall can be a limiting factor for cassava growth so higher rainfall will be associated with higher incidence of disease. Populations of whitefly will increase with rainfall, but heavy rains may impede whitefly spread and thus decrease incidence of virus.

Timing of planting can play an important role in the severity of disease, with cassava planted in March showing a 74% incidence rate of CMV, compared with 4% in August. Seasonal distribution of the virus will vary with the climate. In tropical rain forest type climates, where it is wet and humid most of the year, rapid virus distribution occurred from November to June, and slow progress occurred from July to September. This timing correlated with higher and lower temperatures. In a study of the disease in the Ivory Coast of Africa, maximum rate of disease spread was reached two months after planting. Little to no infection occurs after three months, and variation in spread was due to change in temperature, radiation and population levels of whitefly.

== Control strategies ==
Control strategies for cassava mosaic disease include sanitation and plant resistance. In this case, sanitation means using cuttings from healthy plants to start with a healthy plot and maintaining that healthy plot by identifying unhealthy plants and immediately removing them. This strategy does not protect them from being inoculated by whiteflies, but research shows that the virus is more aggressive in plants infected from contaminated cuttings than by insect vectors. There are also specific varieties that fare better against some viruses than others, so plant resistance is possible. For example, hybrids that are a result of crossing cassava and other species, such as Manihot melanobasis and M. glaziovii, have been shown to have considerable resistance to CMV.

Prevention methods of CMV spread include, avoiding planting alternative hosts of the virus, such as castor bean (Ricinus communis), adjacent to cassava, avoiding planting cassava if neighbouring fields have virus-infected cassava as these could be carried by Whiteflies. Prevention methods also include not planting alternative hosts of the virus vector Whitefly e.g. tomato.

The CABI-led programme, Plantwise suggests intercropping with cereals and legumes, such as maize or cowpeas, to repel whiteflies and rotate cassava with non-host crops including sorghum.

The Ministry of Agriculture Food Security and Cooperatives of Tanzania recommend uprooting diseased plants once every week by pulling them out by hand. Plants should be carried away from the field and exposed to the sunlight for drying and then burned to kill the viruses.

Most research has been done under unrealistic conditions and so relates only poorly to application in the field. Rare studies under realistic conditions include Mollard 1987 and Otim-Nape et al 1994.

== Importance ==
Mostly grown as a food source in Africa, cassava is the third largest source of carbohydrates in the world. In recent times, cassava production has turned from subsistence to commercial production.

CMD was first described in 1894 and is now considered one of the most damaging crop viruses in the world. Annual economic losses in East and Central Africa are estimated to be between US$1.9 billion and $2.7 billion. Although cassava is also cultivated in Latin America and South East Asia, the geminiviruses infecting it are only found in Africa and the Indian sub-continent. This has been mainly attributed to the inability of B. tabaci to colonize cassava effectively in this part of the world.

The Ministry of Agriculture Food Security and Cooperatives of Tanzania recommend uprooting diseased plants once every week by pulling them out by hand. Plants should be carried away from the field and exposed to the sunlight for drying and then burned to kill the viruses.

== Sources ==
This article incorporates text from a free content work. Licensed under CC-BY-SA (license statement/permission). Text taken from PMDG Green List: Cassava mosaic disease, Plantwise, CABI.

This article incorporates text from a free content work. Licensed under CC-BY-SA (license statement/permission). Text taken from Plantwise Factsheets for Farmers: Control of cassava mosaic disease by uprooting, Jumbe A. Ahmed, CABI.
