= Cassava brown streak virus disease =

Cassava brown streak virus

Virus classification
- (unranked): Virus
- Realm: Riboviria
- Kingdom: Orthornavirae
- Phylum: Pisuviricota
- Class: Stelpaviricetes
- Order: Patatavirales
- Family: Potyviridae
- Genus: Ipomovirus
- Species: Cassava brown streak virus

Viral disease of cassava plants

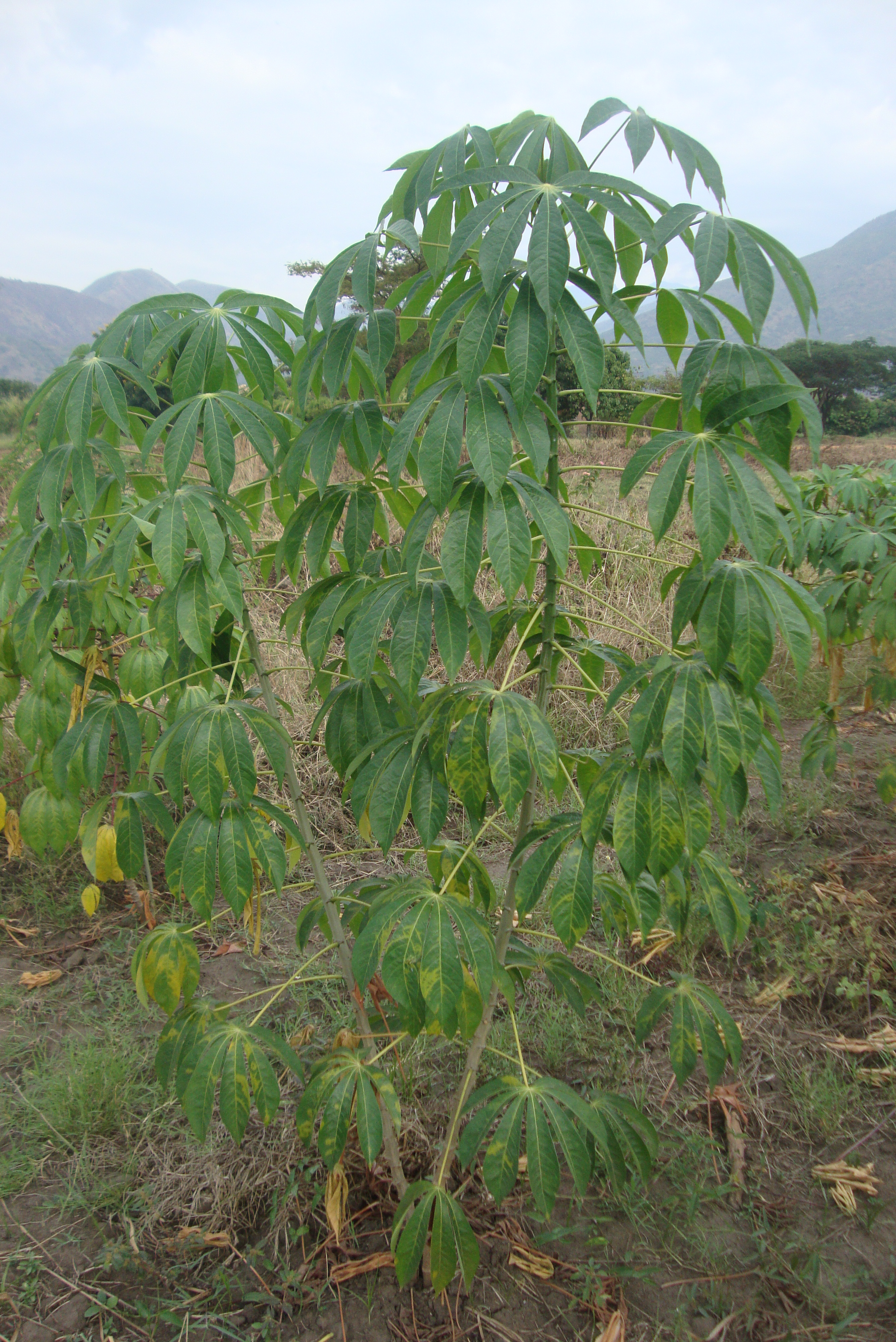
Cassava plant with the typical symptoms of CBSD

Cassava brown streak virus disease (CBSD) is a damaging disease of cassava plants, and is especially troublesome in East Africa. It was first identified in 1936 in Tanzania, and has spread to other coastal areas of East Africa, from Kenya to Mozambique. Recently, it was found that two distinct viruses are responsible for the disease: Cassava brown streak virus (CBSV) and Ugandan cassava brown streak virus (UCBSV). Both have (+)ss RNA genomes, belong to the genus Ipomovirus in the family Potyviridae, and produce generally similar symptoms in infected plants. Root rot renders the cassava tuber inedible, resulting in severe loss of economic value; therefore, current research focuses on achieving cultivars that do not develop the necrotic rot. This disease is considered to be the biggest threat to food security in coastal East Africa and around the eastern lakes.

== Symptoms ==
CBSD is characterized by severe chlorosis and necrosis on infected leaves, giving them a yellowish, mottled appearance. Chlorosis may be associated with the veins, spanning from the mid vein, secondary and tertiary veins, or rather in blotches unconnected to veins. Leaf symptoms vary greatly depending on a variety of factors. The growing conditions (i.e. altitude, rainfall quantity), plant age, and the virus species account for these differences. Brown streaks may appear on the stems of the cassava plant. Also, a dry brown-black necrotic rot of the cassava tuber exists, which may progress from a small lesion to the whole root. Finally, the roots can become constricted due to the tuber rot, stunting growth. Typically the affected plants do not possess all of these characteristics, but those that are severely affected may. Farmers may be unaware of their infected cassava crops until they are harvested and see the tuber lesions because leaves are asymptomatic. The cassava mosaic virus (CMV) is another cassava virus that exhibits foliar symptoms similar to CBSD, but they are more obvious.

UCBSV has milder symptoms than CBSV, and lower pathogenicity.

== Vector and disease cycle ==
After a period of ambiguity among researchers, the consensus is that the most likely candidate of CBSD vector is Bemisia tabaci biotype B, the silverleaf whitefly. It is also sometimes referred to as B. argentifolii. There is a close association between surging whitefly populations and CBSD incidence. This whitefly species is also considered to be the vector of CMV. It is suggested, however, that B. tabaci whiteflies transmit CBSVs less effectively than CMVs. Also, the CBSD retention period in B. tabaci may not exceed more than 24 h, but more research is needed to confirm this.

The adult B. tabaci lives an average of sixteen days, and the maturation process from egg to adult is thirty days. Eggs may be deposited haphazardly or in a spiral fashion on the leaf undersides. Both juvenile and adult whiteflies feed on the phloem of the leaves by inserting a sucker mouth part into the leaf, thereby transmitting the virus to the plant. Saliva containing toxins is also injected into the cassava plant while whiteflies feed, disturbing plant growth and ultimately reducing yield. Seedlings are particularly affected.

== Disease spread ==
After its first identification in 1936, CBSD was almost totally eliminated in Uganda due to program efforts, and there were relatively small yield losses in affected areas. The disease was restricted to < 1000 m above sea level along coastal Kenya to Mozambique, and the shores of Lake Malawi. However, as of the year 2000, CBSD has spread rapidly throughout Eastern Africa. Midaltitude levels (1200–1500 m above sea level) now accommodates CBSD, as it has been reported in Uganda, Democratic Republic Congo, and around Tanzanian lake zones. As of 2009, CBSD outbreaks were most prevalent in south - central Uganda and in Mara Region. There have also been reports of CBSD in Rwanda and Burundi.

The incidence of CBSD is greatest in Uganda where there is resistance to CMV in cassava and other locations in general. Recent surveys demonstrated that of the 23 districts in Uganda surveyed, 70% had CMD-resistant cassava varieties, and all are vulnerable to CBSD – causing viruses. These varieties also hosted as many as 200 adult whiteflies on the top five cassava leaves.

Predictions cannot be made about the spreading pattern. Because the disease does not fan out from only one source point, but rather appears in remote areas, or “hot spots,” models are difficult to devise. This challenge may arise from the movement of cuttings from infected regions and/or an abundance of whiteflies in a particular area.

== Management of CBSD ==
Management tools are still being explored for the control of CBSD, and progress has been slow. The development of cassava with resistance to both CMD and CBSD is needed.

=== Germplasm resistance screen ===
In a few cassava varieties, natural resistance has been found against UBCSV. Widespread distribution of germplasm of these varieties can reduce disease incidence on a large scale. Furthermore, screening for resistance in farmer-preferred cassava genotypes in Africa is crucial for effective CBSD control and management.

Ugandan cassava brown streak virus is a causing agent of CBSD and was the first member of the genus Ipomovirus to be cloned and rescued using a plasmid cDNA vector system. Pasin et al., 2017 develops and presents the pLX transformation vector and uses it to produce a UCBSV clone. This plasmid-only system greatly simplifies plant inoculation and screen for resistance against UCBSV.

=== Genetic engineering ===
Genetic engineering specific to the RNA genome is used to encourage resistance in cassava cultivars. A recent study demonstrated that inducing the expression of hairpin RNA homologous to viral sequences is a potentially effective lab technique because it imitates the behavior of the plant immune system encountering foreign bodies. Specifically, they were able to use hairpin RNA homologous to the 3’ end of CBSV coat protein sequences in the cassava cultivar 60444 to develop resistance to both CBSV and UCBSV. The resulting construct was transferred to a cultivar that farmers prefer (Nigerian landrace TME 7). This particular cultivar exhibited CMV resistance originally in its natural state, the motive being to foster resistance to both CMV and CBSV post – grafting, which was successful. Therefore, the suggestion is that exploiting the immune system of plants that already have natural resistance to CMV is a potentially viable method to combat both viruses.

Gomez et al. 2019 demonstrate that CBSV and UCBSV viral genome-linked proteins (VPg) interact with cassava novel cap-binding proteins (nCBP, specifically nCBP-1 and nCBP-2). They then generated CRISPR mutagenesis cassava mutants and demonstrated tolerance to both viruses. This indicates these interactions are necessary for pathogenesis.

=== Education ===
Farmers need to be better educated on the subject of CBSD, including cause, diagnosis and disease spread. The most obvious symptom of the disease is the cassava root rot, and farmers are inclined to believe that too much water causes the rotting rather than the virus. The identification of the foliar symptoms is important, because farmers can get a more accurate yield expectation without waiting for the harvest period. Also, awareness of tolerant varieties can be promoted. It is suggested that workshops be held for researchers, so that they are aware of new diagnostics.

=== Need for more data ===
More surveys need to be conducted so that the disease spread and variant affinity can be better understood. Discouragement of affected varieties as crops can be more quickly done with tracking. There is emphasis on the need for more research pertaining to the viral pathogenesis.

=== Other suggestions ===
- Slash-and-burn: In certain areas, destroying cassava plants with CBSD through slash-and-burn techniques and replacing them with resistant or more tolerant strains
- Border surveillance: Tightening surveillance points between countries (i.e. Tanzania–Uganda and Kenya borders)
- Regulatory testing of tissue samples cross-border: Only allowing the transport of tested germplasm cross-border

== Economic importance ==
Cassava is a very important staple crop for many in Africa, and the demand for it increases with high population growth rates. CBSD poses a serious threat to farmers in East Africa, because crop yields can be reduced as drastically as 70%. Upon harvesting, farmers will cut out the necrotic lesions of affected tubers or they will discard tubers that are severely affected. 10 – 30% of root rot constitutes moderate infection, decreasing the market value of tubers by 90%. It is estimated that African farmers collectively lose revenue of up to $100 million annually due to the devastating disease.
