= Rhopalosiphum padi virus =

Species of virus

IRES_RhPV
- Predicted secondary structure and sequence conservation Rhopalosiphum padi virus 5'UTR internal ribosome entry site

Identifiers
- Rfam: RF02658

Other data
- Domain(s): Bacteria
- GO: GO:0043022
- SO: SO:0000243
- PDB structures: PDBe

Rhopalosiphum padi virus

Virus classification
- (unranked): Virus
- Realm: Riboviria
- Kingdom: Orthornavirae
- Phylum: Pisuviricota
- Class: Pisoniviricetes
- Order: Picornavirales
- Family: Dicistroviridae
- Genus: Cripavirus
- Species: Cripavirus ropadi

Rhopalosiphum padi virus (RhPV) is a member of Dicistroviridae family, which includes cricket paralysis virus (CrPV), Plautia stali intestine virus and Drosophila C virus. Its 5'UTR region contains an internal ribosome entry site (IRES) element with a cross-kingdom activity. It can function efficiently in mammalian, plant and insect translation systems. Testing of R. padi aphids collected from different sites in Sweden revealed the presence of RhPV in wild aphid populations for the first time in Europe. Virus could be detected in several life stages of R. padi, including sexual individuals and eggs, establishing an over-wintering route for the virus.
