= BiP internal ribosome entry site =

bip internal ribosome entry site (IRES)
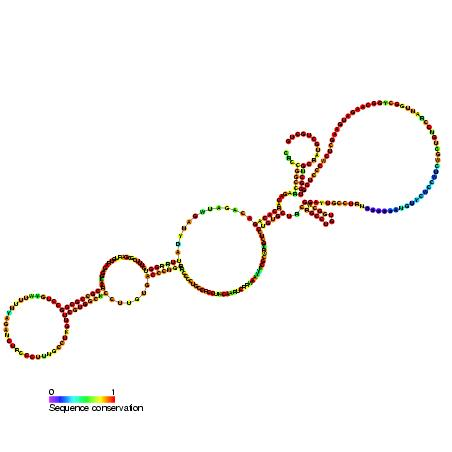
- Predicted secondary structure and sequence conservation of IRES_Bip

Identifiers
- Symbol: IRES_Bip
- Alt. Symbols: Bip_IRES
- Rfam: RF00223

Other data
- RNA type: Cis-reg; IRES
- Domain: Eukaryota
- GO: GO:0043022
- SO: SO:0000243
- PDB structures: PDBe

The BiP internal ribosome entry site (IRES) is an RNA element present in the 5' UTR of the mRNA of BiP protein and allows cap-independent translation. BiP protein expression has been found to be significantly enhanced by the heat shock response due to internal ribosome entry site (IRES)-dependent translation. It is thought that this translational mechanism is essential for the survival of cells under stress.
