= Cripavirus =

Virus classification
- (unranked): Virus
- Realm: Riboviria
- Kingdom: Orthornavirae
- Phylum: Pisuviricota
- Class: Pisoniviricetes
- Order: Picornavirales
- Family: Dicistroviridae
- Genus: Cripavirus

Genus of viruses

Cripavirus is a genus of viruses in the order Picornavirales, in the family Dicistroviridae. Invertebrates serve as natural hosts. There are five species in this genus. Diseases associated with this genus include: DCV: increased reproductive potential; extremely pathogenic when injected with high associated mortality; CrPV: paralysis and death. These viruses can produce proteins directly from their RNA genome upon entering a cell; and therefore, does not require an RNA polymerase packaged in with it, as this may be produced from the genome after entering the cell. The name of the Cripavirus genus originates from its most famous member the Cricket Paralysis Virus. Which was made famous by its rather unusual IRES (Internal Ribosome Entry Site): the Cripavirus IRES. The Cripavirus IRES is an RNA element that allows the virus to bind the ribosome and translate without a need for any initiation factors – as initiation is the most regulated step of translation this allows the virus to avoid many mechanisms to inhibit viral activity.

== Taxonomy ==
The genus contains the following species, listed by scientific name and followed by the exemplar virus of the species:

- Cripavirus drosophilae, Drosophila C virus
- Cripavirus grylli, Cricket paralysis virus
- Cripavirus mortiferum, Aphid lethal paralysis virus
- Cripavirus porteri, Solenopsis invicta virus 6
- Cripavirus ropadi, Rhopalosiphum padi virus

== Structure ==
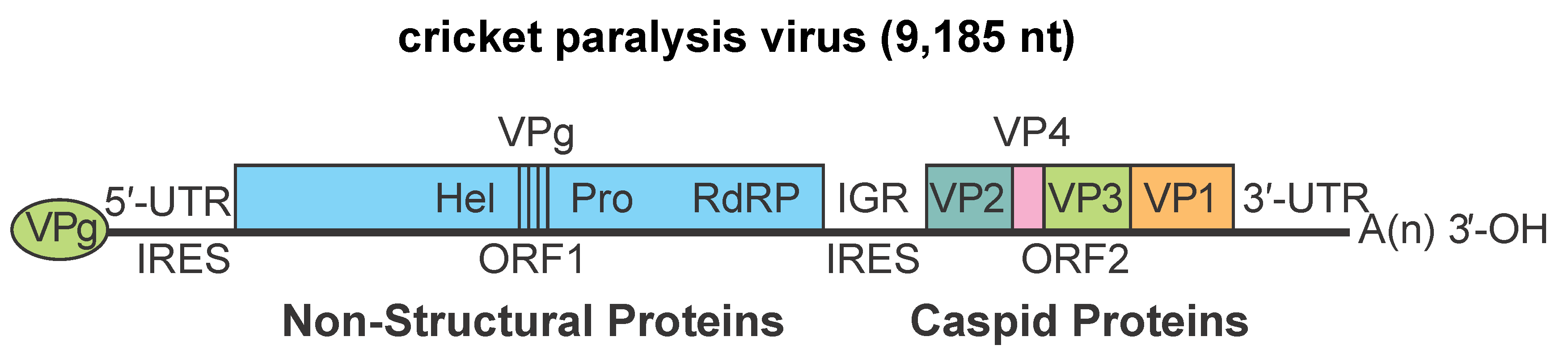
Genome of cricket paralysis virus (CrPV) from family Dicistroviridea

Viruses in Cripavirus are non-enveloped, have capsids of 12 capsomers, and have icosahedral geometries with T=pseudo3 symmetry. The diameter is around 30 nm. Genomes are linear and non-segmented, around 8.5–10.2kb in length, and has a VPg (genome linked viral protein) on the 5' end. The 5' end also has a series of C's near it, while the 3' end has a series of A's near it. The genome has 2 open reading frames.

Genus	Structure	Symmetry	Capsid	Genomic arrangement	Genomic segmentation
Cripavirus	Icosahedral	Pseudo T=3	Non-enveloped	Linear	Monopartite

== Life cycle ==
Entry into the host cell is achieved by penetration into the host cell. Replication follows the positive stranded RNA virus replication model. Positive stranded rna virus transcription is the method of transcription. Translation takes place by viral initiation, and ribosomal skipping. Invertebrates serve as the natural host. Transmission routes are contamination.

Genus	Host details	Tissue tropism	Entry details	Release details	Replication site	Assembly site	Transmission
Cripavirus	Invertebrates	None	Cell receptor endocytosis	Budding	Cytoplasm	Cytoplasm	Food
