= Hepatitis C virus internal ribosome entry site =

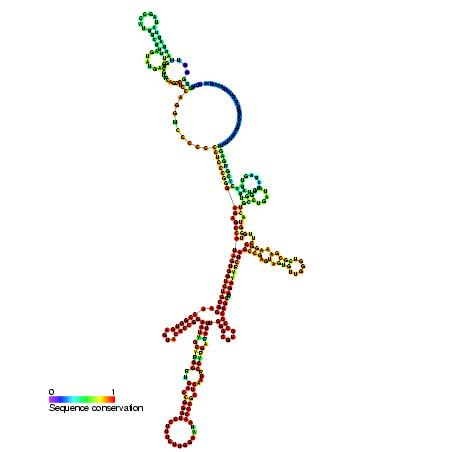
- Predicted secondary structure and sequence conservation of IRES_HCV

Identifiers
- Symbol: IRES_HCV
- Alt. Symbols: HCV_IRES
- Rfam: RF00061

Other data
- RNA type: Cis-reg; IRES
- Domain: Viruses
- GO: GO:0043022
- SO: SO:0000243
- PDB structures: PDBe

The Hepatitis C virus internal ribosome entry site, or HCV IRES, is an RNA structure within the 5'UTR of the HCV genome that mediates cap-independent translation initiation.

Protein translation of most eukaryotic mRNAs occurs by a cap-dependent mechanism and requires association of Met-tRNA_{i}^{Met}, several eukaryotic initiation factors, and GTP with the 40S ribosomal subunit, recruitment to the 5' cap, and scanning along the 5' UTR to reach to start codon. In contrast, translation of hepatitis C virus (HCV) mRNA is initiated by a different mechanism from the usual 5' cap-binding model. This alternate mechanism relies on the direct binding of the 40S ribosomal subunit by the internal ribosome entry site (IRES) in the 5' UTR of HCV RNA. The HCV IRES adopts a complex structure, and may differ significantly from IRES elements identified in picornaviruses. A small number of eukaryotic mRNAs has been shown to be translated by internal ribosome entry.

== IRES structure ==
Nucleotides 1–40 of the HCV mRNA are thought not to contribute to translation, and are rather required for genomic RNA replication. The remainder of the HCV 5'-UTR consists of three domains, namely domains II-IV (domain I is located on the 5'-end of the mRNA).

== Mechanism of action ==
HCV IRES independently binds two components of eukaryotic translation initiation machinery, the multiprotein initiation factor eIF3 and 40S small ribosomal subunit. Moreover, it binds 40S in such a manner that AUG initiator codon is positioned in the ribosomal P-site, thus no ribosomal scanning is required. Consequently scanning factors eIF1 and eIF1A are dispensable for the HCV translation, as are components of the eIF4F complex (eIF4A, eIF4E, and eIF4G) and eIF4B, which are generally required for mRNA binding and unwinding of 5'UTR. Initiator tRNA is delivered either by eIF2 or, in stress conditions when eIF2 is inactivated, by eIF2A, eIF2D, or possibly eIF5B, a homologue of prokaryotic IF2 protein.

== See also ==
- Eukaryotic translation
- Eukaryotic initiation factor
