= Heat shock protein 70 internal ribosome entry site =

Heat shock protein 70 (Hsp70) IRES
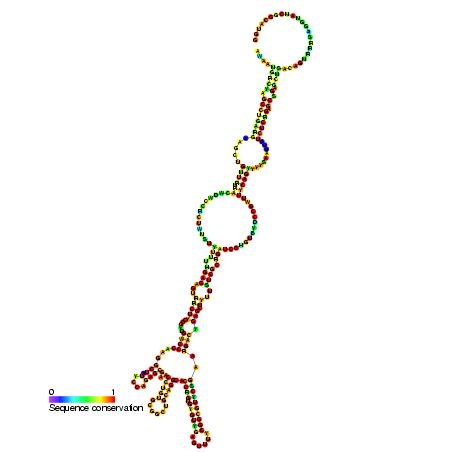
- Predicted secondary structure and sequence conservation of IRES_Hsp70

Identifiers
- Symbol: IRES_Hsp70
- Rfam: RF00495

Other data
- RNA type: Cis-reg; IRES
- Domain: Eukaryota
- GO: GO:0043022
- SO: SO:0000243
- PDB structures: PDBe

The heat shock protein 70 (Hsp70) internal ribosome entry site (IRES) is an RNA element that allows cap independent translation during conditions such as heat shock and stress. It has been shown that the 216 nucleotide long 5' UTR contains internal ribosome entry site activity.
