= C-myc internal ribosome entry site =

c-myc internal ribosome entry site (IRES)
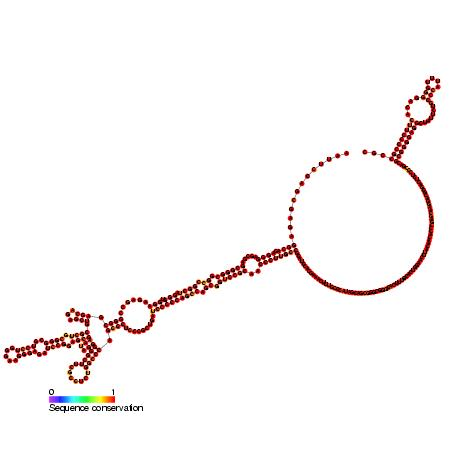
- Predicted secondary structure and sequence conservation of IRES_c-myc

Identifiers
- Symbol: IRES_c-myc
- Alt. Symbols: c-myc_IRES
- Rfam: RF00216

Other data
- RNA type: Cis-reg; IRES
- Domain: Eukaryota
- GO: GO:0043022
- SO: SO:0000243
- PDB structures: PDBe

The c-myc internal ribosome entry site (IRES) is an RNA element present in the 5' UTR of the mRNA of C-myc and allows cap-independent translation. The mammalian c-myc gene is a proto-oncogene which is required for cell proliferation, transformation and death. c-myc mRNA has an alternative method of translation via internal ribosome entry where ribosomes are recruited to the IRES located in the 5' UTR thus bypassing the typical eukaryotic cap-dependent translation pathway.
