= Lacto-rpoB RNA motif =

Lacto-rpoB RNA
- Consensus secondary structure of Lacto-rpoB RNAs

Identifiers
- Symbol: Lacto-rpoB RNA
- Rfam: RF01709

Other data
- Domain: lactic acid bacteria
- PDB structures: PDBe

The Lacto-rpoB RNA motif is a conserved RNA structure identified by bioinformatics. It has been detected only in lactic acid bacteria, and is always located in the presumed 5' untranslated regions of rpoB genes. These genes encode a subunit of RNA polymerase, and it is hypothesized that Lacto-rpoB RNA participate in the regulation of these genes.
