= C-sis internal ribosome entry site =

c-sis internal ribosome entry site (IRES)
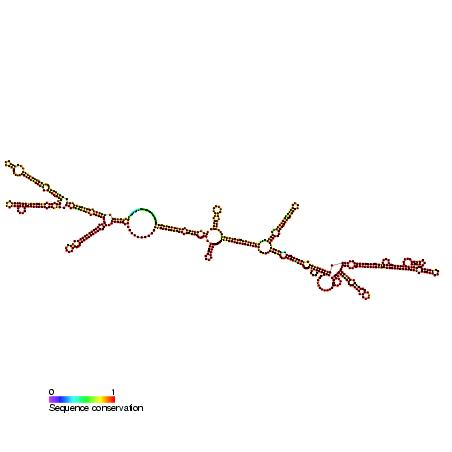
- Predicted secondary structure and sequence conservation of IRES_c-sis

Identifiers
- Symbol: IRES_c-sis
- Rfam: RF00549

Other data
- RNA type: Cis-reg; IRES
- Domain: Eukaryota
- GO: GO:0043022
- SO: SO:0000243
- PDB structures: PDBe

The c-sis internal ribosome entry site (IRES) is a RNA element found in the 5' UTR of the PDGF beta chain gene. The internal ribosome entry site contains three modules that can individually mediate internal ribosome entry. However, the full length sequence is required for maximal IRES activity. It is thought that the three IRES elements are somehow responsive to cellular changes and act to regulate the level of translation.
