= F2A =

F2A or F2a may refer to:

- F2A peptide, a 2A self-cleaving peptides.
- Brewster F2A Buffalo
- Mitsubishi F-2A, a Japanese fighter aircraft, based on the F-16 Fighting Falcon
- F2a, a designation for certain Canadian Pacific 4-4-4 locomotives
