= RTP3 (gene) =

Protein-coding gene in humans

Identifiers
- Aliases: RTP3, LTM1, TMEM7, Z3CXXC3, receptor transporter protein 3
- External IDs: OMIM: 607181; GeneCards: RTP3

Gene location (Human)
Chr.	Chromosome 3 (human)
Band	3p21.31	Start	46,494,611 bp
Band	3p21.31	End	46,500,950 bp
RNA expression pattern
Bgee	Human / Mouse (ortholog); Top expressed in: right lobe of liver; gonad; testicle; gastrocnemius muscle; human kidney; right testis; muscle of thigh; right lobe of thyroid gland; skeletal muscle tissue; left testis / n/a; More reference expression data
BioGPS	n/a
Gene ontology
Molecular function	protein binding; olfactory receptor binding
Cellular component	cytoplasm; integral component of membrane; membrane; cell surface
Biological process	protein insertion into membrane; detection of chemical stimulus involved in sensory perception of bitter taste; protein targeting to membrane
Sources:Amigo / QuickGO
Orthologs
Databases	NCBI: entry; OMA: entry
Species	Human	Mouse
Entrez	83597	n/a
Ensembl	ENSG00000163825	n/a
UniProt	Q9BQQ7	n/a
RefSeq (mRNA)	NM_031440	n/a
RefSeq (protein)	NP_113628	n/a
Location (UCSC)	Chr 3: 46.49 – 46.5 Mb	n/a
PubMed search		n/a
- Wikidata
View/Edit Human

RTP3 (receptor transporter protein 3) is a gene located on chromosome 3 in humans that encodes the RTP3 protein. Its expression is liver-restricted.

== Gene ==
Aliases for RTP3 in Homo sapiens include LTM1, TMEM7, and Z3CXXC3. It is located at locus 3p21.31 and contains two exons. It spans a total of 2,974 base pairs, between bases 46497976 and 46500950 on chromosome 3.

== Protein ==
There is only one known protein isoform in humans, which is 232 amino acids long and has a predicted molecular weight of 26.9 kDa. It has a predicted isoelectric point of 9. The protein contains a transmembrane domain near the C-terminus. The protein is rich in cysteine and tryptophan and is poor in aspartic acid.

== Gene regulation ==
Regulation of the RTP3 gene appears to be tissue-specific, as it is expressed almost exclusively in the liver, with low levels of expression in the testes, thyroid, kidney, and adrenal gland.

There are some poorly-conserved binding sites for miRNA molecules in the 3' untranslated region of the gene. One of these is miRNA-29, which has been found to affect progression of liver tumors in mouse models.

== Homologs ==
=== Orthologs ===
Many animal species contain orthologs of the RTP3 gene, including various species of mammals, rodents, and birds.

=== Paralogs ===
RTP3 has several paralogs in humans, including other members of the RTP family.

== Interacting proteins ==
While there is experimental evidence RTP3 may potentially be able to interact with proteins involved in olfactory signaling, as it contains shared homology with other members of the RTP family that do so, it is unlikely that it contributes greatly to olfactory signaling pathways due to its expression being almost exclusive to the liver.

== Clinical significance ==
The RTP3 gene has been found to be downregulated in liver carcinomas. In cell lines that do not contain p53, a tumor suppressor protein, RTP3 has found to be more highly expressed than in cell lines that do contain the protein.

Single-nucleotide polymorphisms in the promoter and intron of the RTP3 gene have been associated with increased risk of hip fracture, suggesting possible involvement of the gene in the TGF-β signaling pathway.
