= Bag-1 internal ribosome entry site =

Bag-1 internal ribosome entry site (IRES)
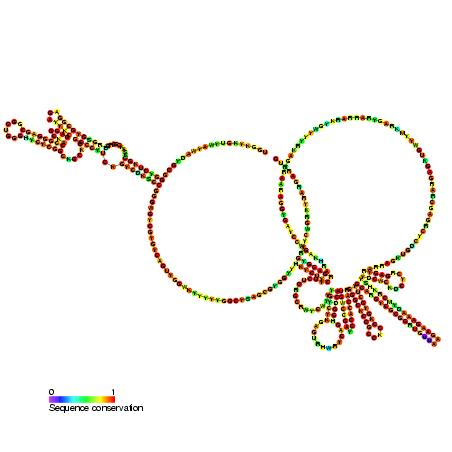
- Predicted secondary structure and sequence conservation of IRES_Bag1

Identifiers
- Symbol: IRES_Bag1
- Alt. Symbols: Bag1_IRES
- Rfam: RF00222

Other data
- RNA type: Cis-reg; IRES
- Domain: Eukaryota
- GO: GO:0043022
- SO: SO:0000243
- PDB structures: PDBe

The BAG-1 internal ribosome entry site (IRES) is a cis-acting element located in the 5 ' untranslated region of the BAG-1 protein mRNA. It affects apoptosis through IRES-mediated translation of the BAG-1 protein.

When expressed, the BAG-1 protein is known to enhance the anti-apoptotic properties of the Bcl-2 protein. Although BAG-1 translation usually occurs via a cap-dependent mechanism, it has been found to contain an IRES in its 5' UTR. Translation via the IRES has been found to be common following heat shock when cap-dependent scanning is compromised.
