= IGF-II =

IGF-II may refer to:

- Insulin-like growth factor 2
- Insulin-like growth factor II IRES
