= DCV =

DCV may refer to:

== Organisations ==
- Basque Christian Democracy (Democracia Cristiana Vasca), a Basque Country Christian-democratic party
- Deutscher Caritasverband, German charity organisation and member of Caritas Europa and Caritas Internationalis

== Science and technology ==
- Demand controlled ventilation, a feedback control method to maintain indoor air quality
- Directional control valve, a part of hydraulic and pneumatic systems; see Hydraulic machinery
- Drosophila C virus, a viral disease of the genus Cripavirus

== Other uses ==
- 605 (DCV in Roman numerals), a common year starting on Friday of the Julian calendar
- 605 (number), a harshad number in Roman numerals
- DCV, a generic ship prefix for deepwater construction vessels
