= HIF-1 alpha IRES =

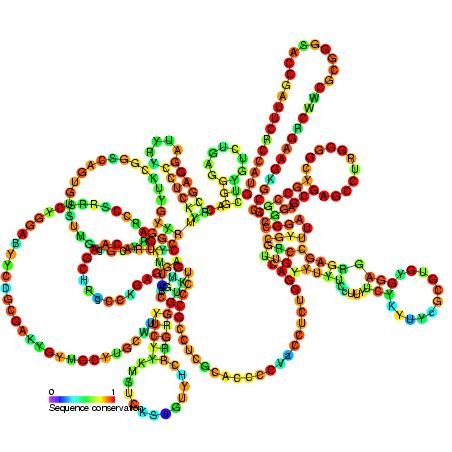
- Predicted secondary structure and sequence conservation of IRES_HIF1

Identifiers
- Symbol: IRES_HIF1
- Rfam: RF00449

Other data
- RNA type: Cis-reg; IRES
- Domain(s): Eukaryota
- GO: GO:0043022
- SO: SO:0000243
- PDB structures: PDBe

The HIF-1α internal ribosome entry site (IRES) is an RNA element present in the 5' UTR of the mRNA of HIF-1α that allows cap-independent translation. The HIF-1α internal ribosome entry site (IRES) allows translation to be maintained under hypoxic cell conditions that inhibit cap-dependent translation [1]. The hypoxia-inducible factor-1α protein (HIF-1α) is a subunit of the HIF-1 transcription factor, which induces transcription of several genes involved in the cellular response to hypoxia.
