= L-myc internal ribosome entry site =

L-myc internal ribosome entry site (IRES)
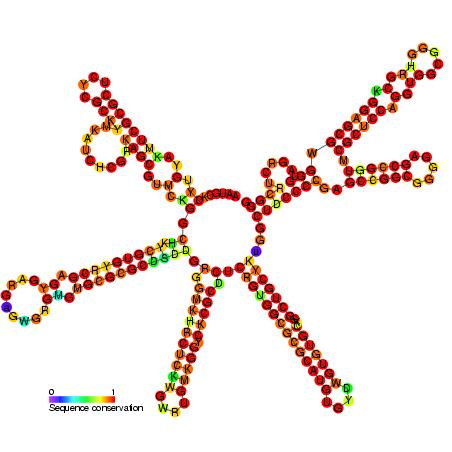
- Predicted secondary structure and sequence conservation of IRES_L-myc

Identifiers
- Symbol: IRES_L-myc
- Rfam: RF00261

Other data
- RNA type: Cis-reg; IRES
- Domain: Eukaryota
- GO: GO:0043022
- SO: SO:0000243
- PDB structures: PDBe

The L-myc internal ribosome entry site (IRES) is an RNA element present in the 5' UTR of the mRNA of L-myc that allows cap-independent translation. L-myc undergoes translation via the internal ribosome entry site and bypasses the typical eukaryotic cap-dependent translation pathway [1]. The myc family of genes when expressed are known to be involved in the control of cell growth, differentiation and apoptosis.
