= FGF-1 internal ribosome entry site =

RNA element

FGF-1 internal ribosome entry site (IRES)
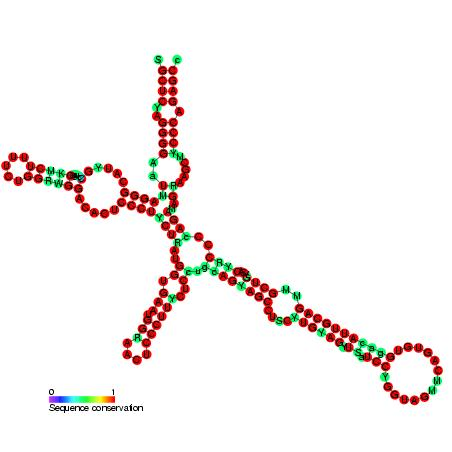
- Predicted secondary structure and sequence conservation of IRES_FGF1

Identifiers
- Symbol: IRES_FGF1
- Rfam: RF00387

Other data
- RNA type: Cis-reg; IRES
- Domain: Eukaryota
- GO: GO:0043022
- SO: SO:0000243
- PDB structures: PDBe

The FGF-1 internal ribosome entry site (IRES) is an RNA element present in the 5' UTR of the mRNA of fibroblast growth factor 1 and allows cap-independent translation. It is thought that FGF-1 internal ribosome entry site (IRES) activity is strictly controlled and highly tissue specific.
