= Leader sequence =

Leader sequence may refer to:

- Leader sequence (mRNA), a sequence of mRNA
- Leading strand, in DNA replication
