= Voltage-gated potassium-channel Kv1.4 IRES =

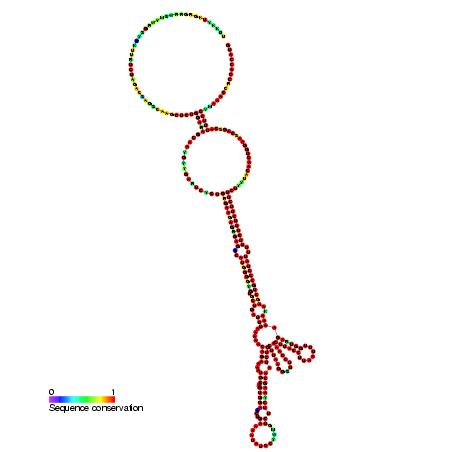
- Predicted secondary structure and sequence conservation of IRES_Kv1_4

Identifiers
- Symbol: IRES_Kv1_4
- Rfam: RF00447

Other data
- RNA type: Cis-reg; IRES
- Domain(s): Eukaryota
- GO: GO:0043022
- SO: SO:0000243
- PDB structures: PDBe

This family represents the K_{v}1.4 voltage-gated potassium channel internal ribosome entry site (IRES). This region has been shown to mediate internal ribosome entry in cells derived from brain, heart, and skeletal muscle; tissues known to express K_{v}1.4 mRNA species.
