= Kaposi's sarcoma-associated herpesvirus internal ribosome entry site =

Kaposi's sarcoma-associated herpesvirus internal ribosome entry site (IRES)
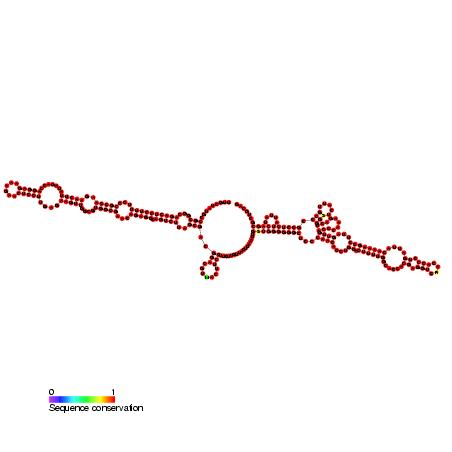
- Predicted secondary structure and sequence conservation of IRES_KSHV

Identifiers
- Symbol: IRES_KSHV
- Rfam: RF00511

Other data
- RNA type: Cis-reg; IRES
- Domain: Viruses
- GO: GO:0043022
- SO: SO:0000243
- PDB structures: PDBe

This family represents the Kaposi's sarcoma-associated herpesvirus (KSHV) internal ribosome entry site (IRES) present in the vCyclin gene. The vCyclin and vFLIP coding sequences are present on a bicistronic transcript and it is thought the IRES may initiate translation of vFLIP from this bicistronic transcript.
