= Pestivirus internal ribosome entry site =

Pestivirus internal ribosome entry site (IRES)
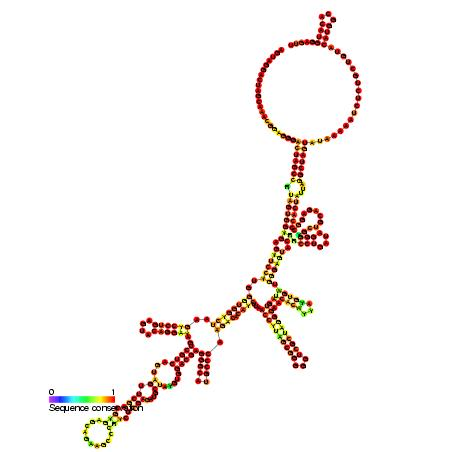
- Predicted secondary structure and sequence conservation of IRES_Pesti

Identifiers
- Symbol: IRES_Pesti
- Alt. Symbols: Pesti_IRES
- Rfam: RF00209

Other data
- RNA type: Cis-reg; IRES
- Domain: Viruses
- GO: GO:0043022
- SO: SO:0000243
- PDB structures: PDBe

This family represents the internal ribosome entry site (IRES) of the pestiviruses. The pestivirus IRES allows cap and end-independent translation of mRNA in the host cell. The IRES achieves this by mediating the internal initiation of translation by recruiting a ribosomal 43S pre-initiation complex directly to the initiation codon and eliminates the requirement for the eukaryotic initiation factor, eIF4F. The classical swine fever virus UTR described appears to be longer at the 5' end than other pestivirus UTRs. This family represents the conserved core.
