= L-peptidase =

Identifiers
- EC no.: 3.4.22.46

Databases
- IntEnz: IntEnz view
- BRENDA: BRENDA entry
- ExPASy: NiceZyme view
- KEGG: KEGG entry
- MetaCyc: metabolic pathway
- PRIAM: profile
- PDB structures: RCSB PDB PDBe PDBsum
Search
- PMC: articles
- PubMed: articles
- NCBI: proteins

L-peptidase (EC 3.4.22.46) is an enzyme. This enzyme catalyses the following chemical reaction

Autocatalytically cleaves itself from the polyprotein of the foot-and-mouth disease virus by hydrolysis of a Lys-Gly bond. Subsequently, it cleaves host cell initiation factor eIF-4G at bonds -Gly-Arg- and -Lys-Arg-

This enzyme is coded bz foot-and-mouth disease virus.
