= Vascular endothelial growth factor (VEGF) IRES A =

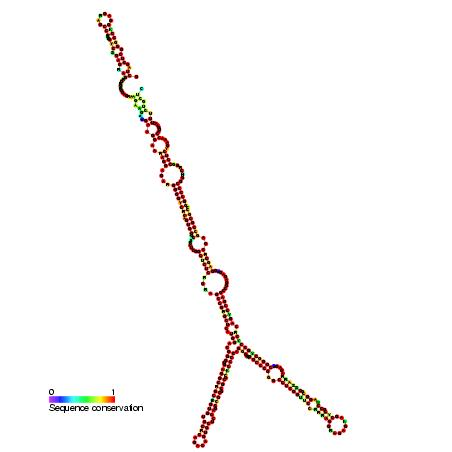
- Predicted secondary structure and sequence conservation of IRES_VEGF_A

Identifiers
- Symbol: IRES_VEGF_A
- Rfam: RF00461

Other data
- RNA type: Cis-reg; IRES
- Domain: Eukaryota
- GO: GO:0043022
- SO: SO:0000243
- PDB structures: PDBe

This family represents the vascular endothelial growth factor (VEGF) internal ribosome entry site (IRES) A. VEGF is an endothelial cell mitogen with many crucial functions such as embryogenic development and wound healing. The 5' UTR of VEGF mRNA contains two IRES elements which are able to promote efficient translation at the AUG start codon, this family represents IRES A.
