= KCNA4 =

Protein-coding gene in the species Homo sapiens

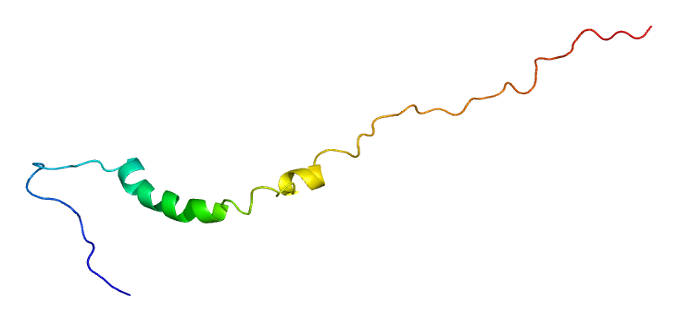

Identifiers
- Aliases: KCNA4, HBK4, HK1, HPCN2, HUKII, KCNA4L, KCNA8, KV1.4, PCN2, potassium voltage-gated channel subfamily A member 4, MCIDDS
- External IDs: OMIM: 176266; MGI: 96661; GeneCards: KCNA4

Gene location (Human)
Chr.	Chromosome 11 (human)
Band	11p14.1	Start	30,009,730 bp
Band	11p14.1	End	30,017,030 bp

Gene location (Mouse)
Chr.	Chromosome 2 (mouse)
Band	2 E3|2 56.12 cM	Start	107,120,984 bp
Band	2 E3|2 56.12 cM	End	107,128,847 bp
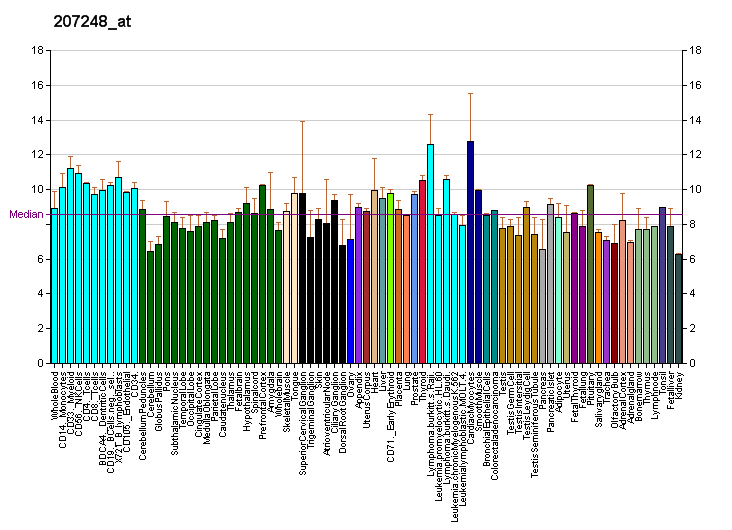
RNA expression pattern
Bgee	Human / Mouse (ortholog); Top expressed in: nucleus accumbens; secondary oocyte; caudate nucleus; left adrenal cortex; putamen; prefrontal cortex; right adrenal gland; right adrenal cortex; ventricular zone; paraflocculus of cerebellum / Top expressed in: nucleus accumbens; lumbar spinal ganglion; medial geniculate nucleus; medial dorsal nucleus; lateral geniculate nucleus; olfactory tubercle; substantia nigra; globus pallidus; mammillary body; supraoptic nucleus; More reference expression data
BioGPS	More reference expression data
Gene ontology
Molecular function	potassium channel activity; potassium ion binding; voltage-gated ion channel activity; ion channel activity; protein binding; voltage-gated potassium channel activity; delayed rectifier potassium channel activity
Cellular component	integral component of membrane; cell projection; membrane; voltage-gated potassium channel complex; plasma membrane; axon; integral component of plasma membrane; dendritic spine
Biological process	regulation of ion transmembrane transport; ion transport; potassium ion transport; transmembrane transport; potassium ion transmembrane transport; protein homooligomerization
Sources:Amigo / QuickGO
Orthologs
Databases	NCBI: entry; OMA: entry
Species	Human	Mouse
Entrez	3739	16492
Ensembl	ENSG00000182255	ENSMUSG00000042604
UniProt	P22459	Q61423
RefSeq (mRNA)	NM_002233	NM_021275
RefSeq (protein)	NP_002224	NP_067250
Location (UCSC)	Chr 11: 30.01 – 30.02 Mb	Chr 2: 107.12 – 107.13 Mb
PubMed search
- Wikidata
View/Edit Human	View/Edit Mouse

Potassium channel Kv1.4 tandem inactivation domain
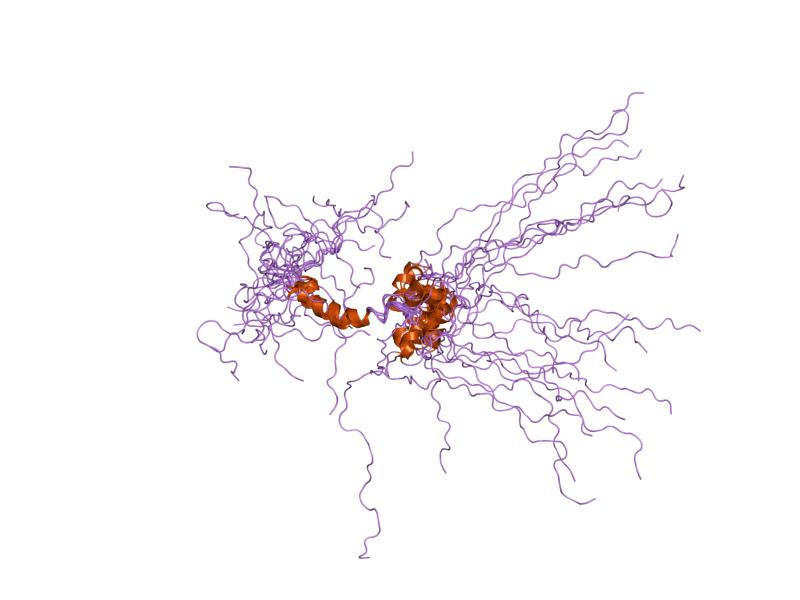
- solution structure of the tandem inactivation domain (residues 1-75) of potassium channel rck4 (kv1.4)

Identifiers
- Symbol: K_channel_TID
- Pfam: PF07941
- InterPro: IPR012897
- SCOP2: 1kn7 / SCOPe / SUPFAM
Available protein structures:
- PDB: IPR012897 PF07941 (ECOD; PDBsum)
- AlphaFold: IPR012897; PF07941

Potassium voltage-gated channel subfamily A member 4 also known as K_{v}1.4 is a protein that in humans is encoded by the KCNA4 gene. It contributes to the cardiac transient outward potassium current (I_{to1}), the main contributing current to the repolarizing phase 1 of the cardiac action potential.

== Description ==
Potassium channels represent the most complex class of voltage-gated ion channels from both functional and structural standpoints. Their diverse functions include regulating neurotransmitter release, heart rate, insulin secretion, neuronal excitability, epithelial electrolyte transport, smooth muscle contraction, and cell volume. Four sequence-related potassium channel genes - shaker, shaw, shab, and shal - have been identified in Drosophila, and each has been shown to have human homolog(s). This gene encodes a member of the potassium channel, voltage-gated, shaker-related subfamily. This member contains six membrane-spanning domains with a shaker-type repeat in the fourth segment. It belongs to the A-type potassium current class, the members of which may be important in the regulation of the fast repolarizing phase of action potentials in heart and thus may influence the duration of cardiac action potential. The coding region of this gene is intronless, and the gene is clustered with genes KCNA3 and KCNA10 on chromosome 1 in humans.

KCNA4 (Kv1.4) contains a tandem inactivation domain at the N terminus. It is composed of two subdomains. Inactivation domain 1 (ID1, residues 1-38) consists of a flexible N terminus anchored at a 5-turn helix, and is thought to work by occluding the ion pathway, as is the case with a classical ball domain. Inactivation domain 2 (ID2, residues 40-50) is a 2.5 turn helix with a high proportion of hydrophobic residues that probably serves to attach ID1 to the cytoplasmic face of the channel. In this way, it can promote rapid access of ID1 to the receptor site in the open channel. ID1 and ID2 function together to bring about fast inactivation of the Kv1.4 channel, which is important for the role of the channel in short-term plasticity.

== Interactions ==
KCNA4 has been shown to interact with DLG4, KCNA2 and DLG1.

== See also ==
- Voltage-gated potassium channel
- Voltage-gated potassium-channel Kv1.4 IRES
