= FGF-2 internal ribosome entry site =

FGF-2 internal ribosome entry site (IRES)
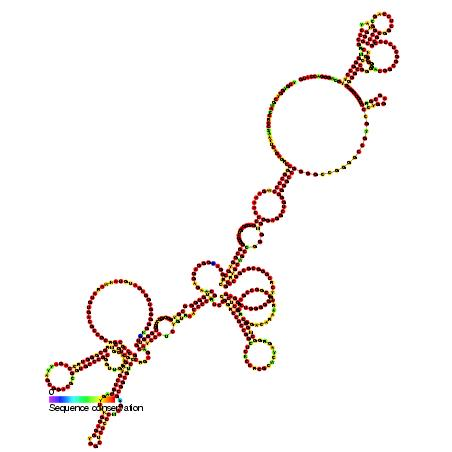
- Predicted secondary structure and sequence conservation of IRES_FGF2

Identifiers
- Symbol: IRES_FGF2
- Alt. Symbols: IRES_FGF; FGF_IRES
- Rfam: RF00224

Other data
- RNA type: Cis-reg; IRES
- Domain: Eukaryota
- GO: GO:0043022
- SO: SO:0000243
- PDB structures: PDBe

The FGF-2 internal ribosome entry site is an RNA element present in the 5' UTR of the mRNA of fibroblast growth factor-2. It has been found that the FGF-2 internal ribosome entry site (IRES) activity is strictly controlled and highly tissue specific. It is thought that translational IRES dependent activation of FGF-2 plays a vital role in embryogenesis and in the adult brain [1]. When expressed the fibroblast growth factor 2 FGF-2 protein plays a pivotal role in cell proliferation, differentiation and survival as well as being involved in wound-healing [1,2].
