= Ribosome shunting =

Aspect of molecular biology

Ribosome shunting is a mechanism of translation initiation in which ribosomes bypass, or "shunt over", parts of the 5' untranslated region to reach the start codon. However, a benefit of ribosomal shunting is that it can translate backwards allowing more information to be stored than usual in an mRNA molecule. Some viral RNAs have been shown to use ribosome shunting as a more efficient form of translation during certain stages of viral life cycle or when translation initiation factors are scarce (e.g. cleavage by viral proteases). Some viruses known to use this mechanism include adenovirus, Sendai virus, human papillomavirus, duck hepatitis B pararetrovirus, rice tungro bacilliform viruses, and cauliflower mosaic virus. In these viruses the ribosome is directly translocated from the upstream initiation complex to the start codon (AUG) without the need to unwind RNA secondary structures.

== Ribosome shunting in Cauliflower mosaic virus ==
Translation of Cauliflower mosaic virus (CaMV) 35S RNA is initiated by a ribosome shunt. The 35S RNA of CaMV contains a ~600 nucleotide leader sequence which contains 7-9 short open reading frames (sORFs) depending on the strain. This long leader sequence has the potential to form an extensive complex stem-loop structure, which is an inhibitory element for expression of following ORFs. However, translation of ORFs downstream of the CaMV 35S RNA leader has been commonly observed. Ribosome shunting model indicates with the collaboration of initiation factors, ribosomes start scanning from capped 5’-end and scans for a short distance until it hits the first sORF. The hairpin structure formed by leader brings the first long ORF into the close spatial vicinity of a 5’-proximal sORF. After read through sORF A, the 80S scanning ribosome disassembles at the stop codon, which is the shunt take-off site. The 40S ribosomal subunits keep combining with RNA, and bypass the strong stem-loop structural element, land at the shunt acceptor site, resume scanning and reinitiate at the first long ORF. 5’-proximal sORF A and the stem-loop structure itself are two essential elements for CaMV shunting [5]. sORFs with 2-15 codons, and 5-10 nucleotides between sORF stop codon and the base of the stem structure are optimal for ribosome shunting, while the minimal (start-stop) ORF does not promote shunting.

== Ribosome shunting in Rice tungro bacilliform pararetrovirus ==
Ribosome shunting process was first discovered in CaMV in 1993, and then was reported in Rice tungro bacilliform virus (RTBV) in 1996. The mechanism of ribosome shunting in RTBV resembles that in CaMV: it also requires the first short ORF as well as a following strong secondary structure. Swapping of the conserved shunt elements between CaMV and RTBV revealed the importance of nucleotide composition of the landing sequence for efficient shunting, indicating that the mechanism of ribosome shunting is evolutionary conserved in plant pararetroviruses.

== Ribosome shunting in Sendai virus ==
Sendai virus Y proteins are initiated by ribosome shunting. Among 8 primary translation products of Sendai virus P/C mRNA, leaky scanning accounts for translation of protein C’, P, and C proteins, while expression of protein Y1 and Y2 is initiated via a ribosomal shunt discontinuous scanning. Scanning complex enters 5’ cap and scan ~50 nucleotides of 5’ UTR, and then is transferred to an acceptor site at or close the Y initiation codons. In the case of Sendai virus, no specific donor site sequences are required.

== Ribosome shunt in Adenovirus ==
Ribosome shunting is observed during expression of late adenovirus mRNAs. Late adenovirus mRNAs contains a 5’ tripartite leader, a highly conserved 200-nucleotide NTR with a 25- to 44- nucleotide unstructured 5’ conformation followed by a complex group of stable hairpin structure, which confers preferential translation by reducing the requirement for the eIF-4F (cap-binding protein complex), which is inactivated by adenovirus to interfere with cellular protein translation. When eIF4E is abundant, the subunit binds to the 5' cap on mRNAs, forming an eIF4 complex leading to shunting; however, when eIF4E is altered or deactivated during late adenovirus infection of heat shock, the tripartite leader exclusively and efficiently directs initiation by shunting.

While Adenovirus required tyrosine kinase to infect the cells without it by disrupting the cap-initiation complex known as the tripartite leader. It disrupts the process via ribosome shunting, in tyrosine phosphorylation. There are two key sites for the binding of the ribosome. In translating viral mRNA and suppressing the translation while being capped by ribosome shunting process. In the case of adenovirus late mRNA and hsp70 mRNA, instead of recognition of stop codon of first short ORF, pausing of translation is caused by scanning ribosome with three conserved sequences that are complementary to the 3’ hairpin of 18S ribosomal RNA. The mechanism for ribosome shunt involves the larger subunit binding upstream of the start codon. The polymerase is then able to leapfrog using protein binding and a power stroke to bypass the start codon on the coding mRNA. The tripate is then inserted into the parent strand to create a new binding site for further replication.
