= J wave =

Abnormal electrocardiogram finding

J wave labelled as Osborn wave. 81-year-old male with BP 80/62 and temperature 31.9 C (89.5 F).

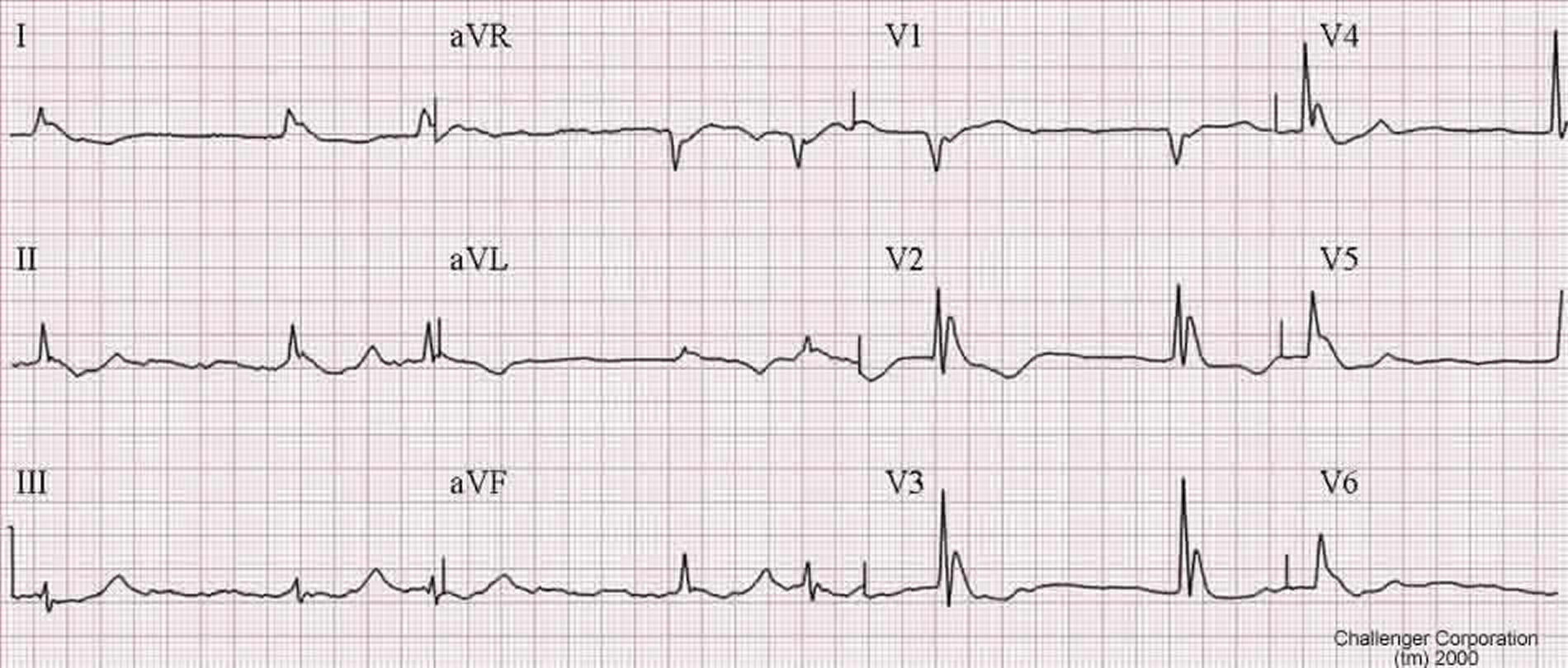
Atrial fibrillation and J wave in a person with hypothermia

A J wave — also known as Osborn wave, camel-hump sign, late delta wave, hathook junction, hypothermic wave, K wave, H wave or current of injury — is an abnormal electrocardiogram finding.

J waves are positive deflections occurring at the junction between the QRS complex and the ST segment, where the S point, also known as the J point, has a myocardial infarction-like elevation.

== Causes ==
They are usually observed in people suffering from hypothermia with a temperature of less than 32 °C (90 °F), though they may also occur in people with very high blood levels of calcium (hypercalcemia), brain injury, vasospastic angina, acute pericarditis, or they could also be a normal variant. Osborn waves on ECG are frequent during targeted temperature management (TTM) after cardiac arrest, particularly in patients treated with 33 °C. Osborn waves are not associated with increased risk of ventricular arrhythmia, and may be considered a benign physiological phenomenon, associated with lower mortality in univariable analyses.

== Mechanism ==
The J wave reflects the transmural gradient of amplitude of the cardiac transient outward K+ current: channels responsible for this current exhibit differential expression across ventricular myocardium, producing a more potent current in the epicardium than the endocardium.

== History ==
The prominent J deflection attributed to hypothermia was first reported in 1938 by Tomaszewski. These waves were then definitively described in 1953 by John J. Osborn (1917–2014) and were named in his honor. Over time, the wave has increasingly been referred to as a J wave, though is still sometimes referred to as the Osborn wave in most part due to Osborn's article in the American Journal of Physiology on experimental hypothermia.
