= Insulin-like growth factor II IRES =

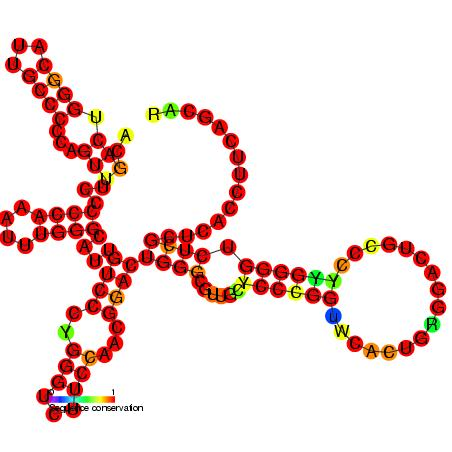
- Predicted secondary structure and sequence conservation of IRES_IGF2

Identifiers
- Symbol: IRES_IGF2
- Rfam: RF00483

Other data
- RNA type: Cis-reg; IRES
- Domain(s): Eukaryota
- GO: GO:0043022
- SO: SO:0000243
- PDB structures: PDBe

The insulin-like growth factor II (IGF-II) internal ribosome entry site IRES is found in the 5' UTR of IGF-II leader 2 mRNA. This RNA element allows cap-independent translation of the mRNA and it is thought that this family may facilitate a continuous IGF-II production in rapidly dividing cells during development. Ribosomal scanning on human insulin-like growth factor II (IGF-II) is hard to comprehend due to one open reading frame and the ability for the hormone to fold into a stable structure.
