= EIF2A =

Protein-coding gene in the species Homo sapiens

Identifiers
- Aliases: EIF2A, EIF-2A, MST089, MSTP004, MSTP089, CDA02, eukaryotic translation initiation factor 2A
- External IDs: OMIM: 609234; MGI: 1098684; GeneCards: EIF2A

Gene location (Human)
Chr.	Chromosome 3 (human)
Band	3q25.1	Start	150,546,678 bp
Band	3q25.1	End	150,586,016 bp

Gene location (Mouse)
Chr.	Chromosome 3 (mouse)
Band	3 D|3 28.58 cM	Start	58,433,242 bp
Band	3 D|3 28.58 cM	End	58,464,922 bp
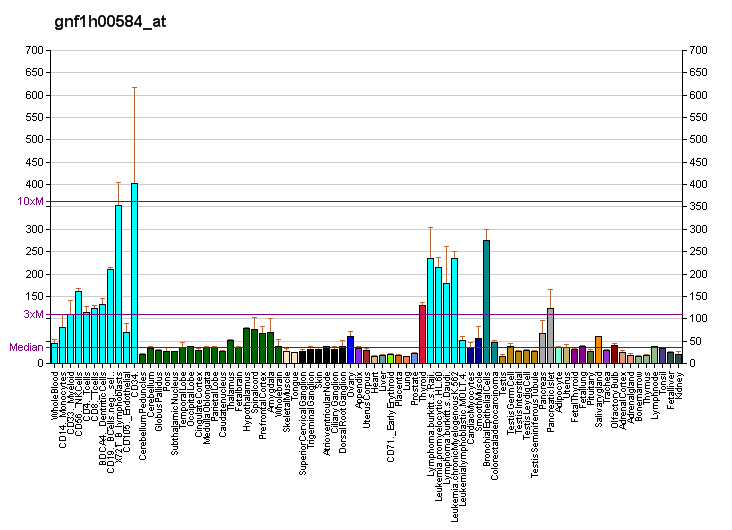
RNA expression pattern
Bgee	Human / Mouse (ortholog); Top expressed in: secondary oocyte; tibialis anterior muscle; pancreatic epithelial cell; skin of arm; body of pancreas; Achilles tendon; deltoid muscle; myocardium of left ventricle; mucosa of ileum; monocyte / Top expressed in: genital tubercle; tail of embryo; ventricular zone; epiblast; hand; muscle of thigh; otolith organ; utricle; lobe of prostate; esophagus; More reference expression data
BioGPS	More reference expression data
Gene ontology
Molecular function	ribosome binding; tRNA binding; protein binding; translation initiation factor activity; mRNA binding; cadherin binding
Cellular component	cytoplasm; eukaryotic translation initiation factor 2 complex; blood microparticle; extracellular space; cytosolic small ribosomal subunit
Biological process	translational initiation; protein phosphorylation; SREBP signaling pathway; positive regulation of signal transduction; ribosome assembly; regulation of translation; protein biosynthesis; response to amino acid starvation
Sources:Amigo / QuickGO
Orthologs
Databases	NCBI: entry; OMA: entry
Species	Human	Mouse
Entrez	83939	229317
Ensembl	ENSG00000144895	ENSMUSG00000027810
UniProt	Q9BY44	Q8BJW6
RefSeq (mRNA)	NM_032025; NM_001319043; NM_001319044; NM_001319045; NM_001319046	NM_001005509
RefSeq (protein)	NP_001305972; NP_001305973; NP_001305974; NP_001305975; NP_114414	NP_001005509
Location (UCSC)	Chr 3: 150.55 – 150.59 Mb	Chr 3: 58.43 – 58.46 Mb
PubMed search
- Wikidata
View/Edit Human	View/Edit Mouse

Eukaryotic translation initiation factor 2A (eIF2A) is a protein that in humans is encoded by the EIF2A gene. The eIF2A protein is not to be confused with eIF2α, a subunit of the heterotrimeric eIF2 complex. Instead, eIF2A functions by a separate mechanism in eukaryotic translation.

== Function ==
eIF2A is a 65 kDa protein that catalyzes the formation of puromycin-sensitive 80S preinitiation complexes (Zoll et al., 2002).[supplied by OMIM] It may be important for translation initiation mediated by the HCV IRES under stress conditions, but this result has been debated.
