= Cricket paralysis virus =

Virus classification
- (unranked): Virus
- Realm: Riboviria
- Kingdom: Orthornavirae
- Phylum: Pisuviricota
- Class: Pisoniviricetes
- Order: Picornavirales
- Family: Dicistroviridae
- Genus: Cripavirus
- Species: Cripavirus grylli

Species of virus

Cricket paralysis virus (CrPV) is a paralytic disease affecting crickets. It was initially discovered in Australian field crickets (Teleogryllus commodus and Teleogryllus oceanicus) by Carl Reinganum and his colleagues at the Victorian Plant Research Institute (Burnley, Melbourne, Australia). The disease spread rapidly through a breeding colony as well as through a laboratory population causing about 95% mortality. This was the first recorded isolate of the virus and is generally referred to as CrPVvic to distinguish it from subsequent isolates.

== Description ==
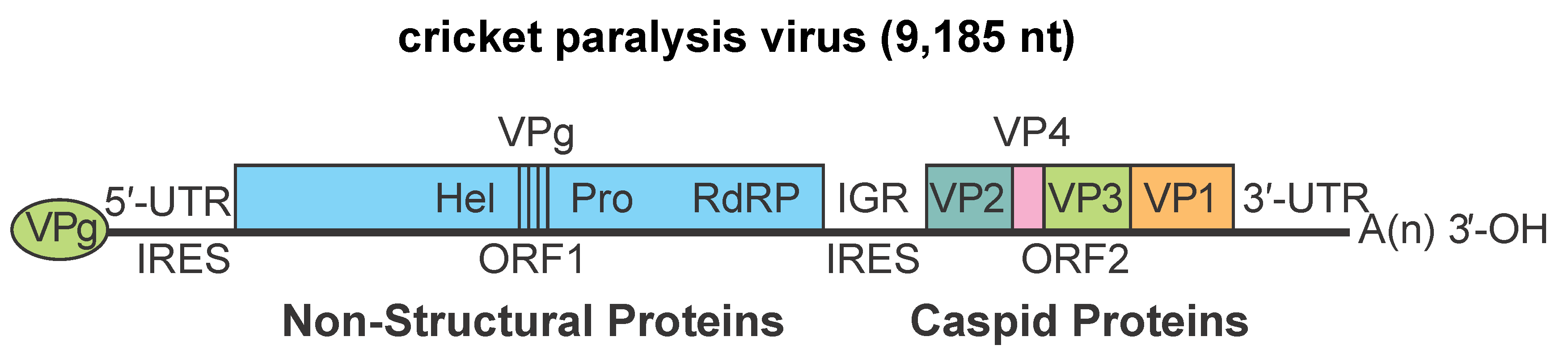
Genome of cricket paralysis virus (CrPV) from family Dicistroviridea

The spheroidal, non-enveloped virus particles of CrPV are about 27 nm diameter in negatively-stained electron micrographs and contain a single piece of positive-sense ssRNA. The virion is composed of four capsid proteins with molecular masses generally reported to be 33, 31 and 30 kilodaltons with a minor VP4 protein of about 8 kDa. The particles resemble those of the mammalian picornaviruses but CrPV virions sediment at a faster rate (167 S) than poliovirus particles (158 S) in sucrose rate-zonal gradients and, in isopycnic neutral cesium chloride gradients, CrPV particles are denser than those of poliovirus (1.368 g/cm^{3} vs 1.340 g/cm^{3} respectively).

== Range ==
CrPV has been detected in a number of insect species from at least five different orders of the class Insecta, in both natural and laboratory populations, and is usually identified by standard serological methods. The infections include not only the Australian cricket species but the New Zealand cricket, Pteronemobius nigrovus, as well as the European house cricket, Acheta domesticus. CrPV does not appear to infect locusts. It is a commonly detected virus in honeybees as an inapparent infection.

The strain CrPVbrk was isolated from the cricket A. domesticus c. 1980, following a major population collapse at a cricket rearing farm in Georgia in the US. A related virus from Arkansas, US, initially called Pseudoplusia includens virus and redesignated CrPVark, was recorded in the mid-1980s. The brk and ark strains are closely related serologically but appear to be very distantly related to the other CrPV isolates so, despite their physical and chemical similarities, it remains speculative that these two American isolates are actually strains of CrPV.

Reported detections and/or isolations of CrPV have been made in Australia, New Zealand, the United States, the United Kingdom and Indonesia. CrPV has one of the widest host-ranges of any virus, insect or not. The potential for the use of CrPV as a biological control agent for insects has been suggested. In laboratory experiments CrPVbrk proved to be extremely infectious and pathogenic for adult Ceratitis capitata (Mediterranean fruit fly). Detailed studies have also been made on the use of a CrPV strain to control the European olive fruit fly (Dacus oleae).

== American outbreaks ==
In 2011, a "cricket paralysis virus" was reported to be involved in other catastrophic collapses in American cricket rearing facilities. A similar report from the UK and European cricket breeders, however, refers to a "cricket paralysis virus" but has identified the causative agent as a small DNA-containing virus, Acheta domesticus densovirus; thus, the North American outbreaks are probably not due to the small RNA virus taxonomically referred to as CrPV. Over 60 million crickets died as a result of the outbreak. Whatever the causative virus, switching to a different species for American breeders is more difficult than it is in Europe, as Acheta domesticus is currently the only cricket approved for commercial distribution, and any new proposals are scrutinized through a permitting process.

== Studies ==
CrPV has been shown to replicate in continuously cultured cell lines derived from the fruit fly Drosophila melanogaster and other insect cell lines. This ability enabled detailed studies on the replication strategy of the virus. The fact that a demonstrable cytopathic effect was also produced in these cultured cell infections led to the development of sensitive titration assay methods similar to those employed in studies of mammalian picornaviruses. In the 1990s large-scale production of the virus in cell suspension cultures of Drosophila or Trichoplusia ni cells made x-ray crystallographic studies feasible. CrPV was the first insect virus to have its crystal structure determined.

Early studies conducted in the 1970s and 1980s showed the occurrence of post-translational processing of a large polyprotein produced during the course of infection of Drosophila cells with CrPV. This was reminiscent of the post-translational cleavages occurring when mammalian cells are infected with vertebrate picornaviruses such as poliovirus. However, the relative amounts of the resultant proteins resulting from the cleavages were puzzlingly unequal with CrPV in contrast to the equimolar levels produced by picornaviruses. Thus, despite some of the physical and genomic translation similarities that CrPV shared with mammalian picornaviruses, classifying CrPV as an insect "picornavirus" was justifiably contentious.

In the later 1990s the elucidation of the crystal structure of CrPV showed that while the conformation of its capsid proteins closely resembled those of picornaviruses, detailed analysis of the complete CrPV genome exposed critical differences. Picornavirus genomes contain only a single open reading frame (ORF) which is translated into a single polyprotein, but CrPV, as well as several other related insect viruses, is translated from two ORFs each driven by a respective internal ribosome entry site (IRES). Also the capsid proteins are encoded at the 3' end of the CrPV genome, the opposite of that for picornaviruses as well being differently ordered within the genome. These crucial characteristics led to the formation of the family Dicistroviridae by the International Committee on Taxonomy of Viruses (ICTV). CrPV is in the genus Cripavirus within this family.

== See also ==
- CrPV IRES
