= Cardiac transient outward potassium current =

Ion current

The cardiac action potential has five phases. I_{to1} is active during phase 1, causing a fast repolarization of the action potential

The cardiac transient outward potassium current (referred to as I_{to1} or I_{to}) is one of the ion currents across the cell membrane of heart muscle cells. It is responsible for the (brief) repolarizing phase 1 of the cardiac action potential (which succeeds depolarisation, and precedes the plateau phase). The I_{to} is produced by movement of positively charged potassium (K^{+}) ions from the intracellular into the extracellular space. It exhibits rapid activation and inactivation. I_{to1} is complemented with I_{to2} resulting from Cl^{−} ions to form the transient outward current I_{to}.

The I_{to1} is generated by voltage-gated K+ channels Kv1.4, Kv4.2, and (especially) Kv4.3; these channels undergo ball-and-chain inactivation to terminate the current.

It occurs in atrial, ventricular, and conduction system cells. In ventricular myocardium, it is more potent in the epicardium than the endocardium; this transmural I_{to1} gradient underlies the J wave ECG finding.

== Role in disease ==
- Reduction in I_{to1} density is associated with prolonged action potentials and is a common finding in cardiac disease.

- I_{to1} density is significantly lower in the cells of a failing heart in comparison to the cells of a healthy heart.
- There is correlation between decreased I_{to1} density and atrial fibrillation.
- I_{to} activation is inhibited by thyrotropin (TSH). This mechanisms may be one of the reasons for the observation that both bradycardia and atrial fibrillation are common in hypothyroidism.

- An increase in the I_{to1} density caused by a mutation in Kv4.3 can be a cause of Brugada Syndrome.
