= APC internal ribosome entry site =

RNA element

APC internal ribosome entry site (IRES)
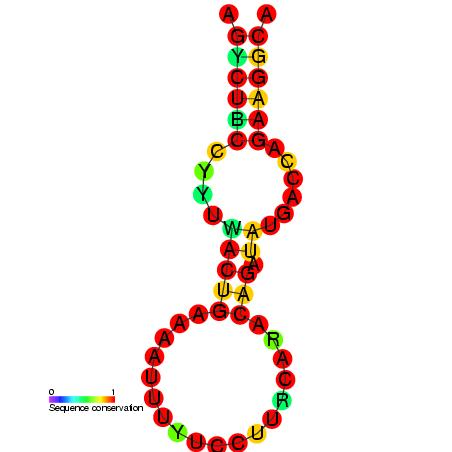
- Predicted secondary structure and sequence conservation of IRES_APC

Identifiers
- Symbol: IRES_APC
- Rfam: RF00462

Other data
- RNA type: Cis-reg; IRES
- Domain: Eukaryota
- GO: GO:0043022
- SO: SO:0000243
- PDB structures: PDBe

The APC internal ribosome entry site (IRES) is an RNA element which is located in the coding sequence of the APC gene. APC is a tumour suppressor gene which is associated with the inherited disease adenomatous polyposis coli (APC). It has been reported to permit internal initiation of translation at codon 184 of APC, potentially allowing some 5′ truncating APC alleles to produce a shorter functional protein associated with attenuated familial adenomatous polyposis. It is thought that IRES-mediated translation of APC is important for an apoptotic cascade.
