= Aphthovirus internal ribosome entry site =

Aphthovirus internal ribosome entry site (IRES)
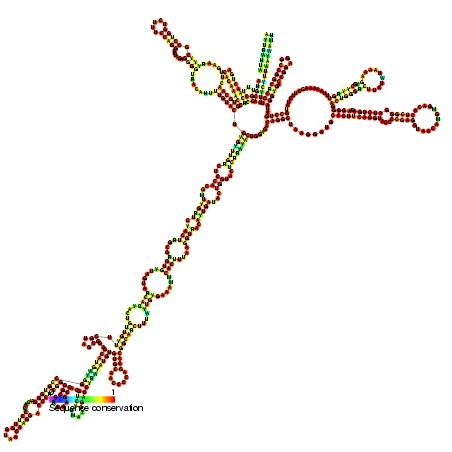
- Predicted secondary structure and sequence conservation of IRES_Aptho

Identifiers
- Symbol: IRES_Aptho
- Alt. Symbols: Aptho_IRES
- Rfam: RF00210

Other data
- RNA type: Cis-reg; IRES
- Domain: Viruses
- GO: GO:0043022
- SO: SO:0000243
- PDB structures: PDBe

This family represents the internal ribosome entry site (IRES) of the Picornaviruses. IRES elements allow cap and end-independent translation of mRNA in the host cell. The IRES achieves this by mediating the internal initiation of translation by recruiting a ribosomal 43S pre-initiation complex directly to the initiation codon and eliminates the requirement for the eukaryotic initiation factor eIF4F.
