= 2A peptides =

Class of peptides

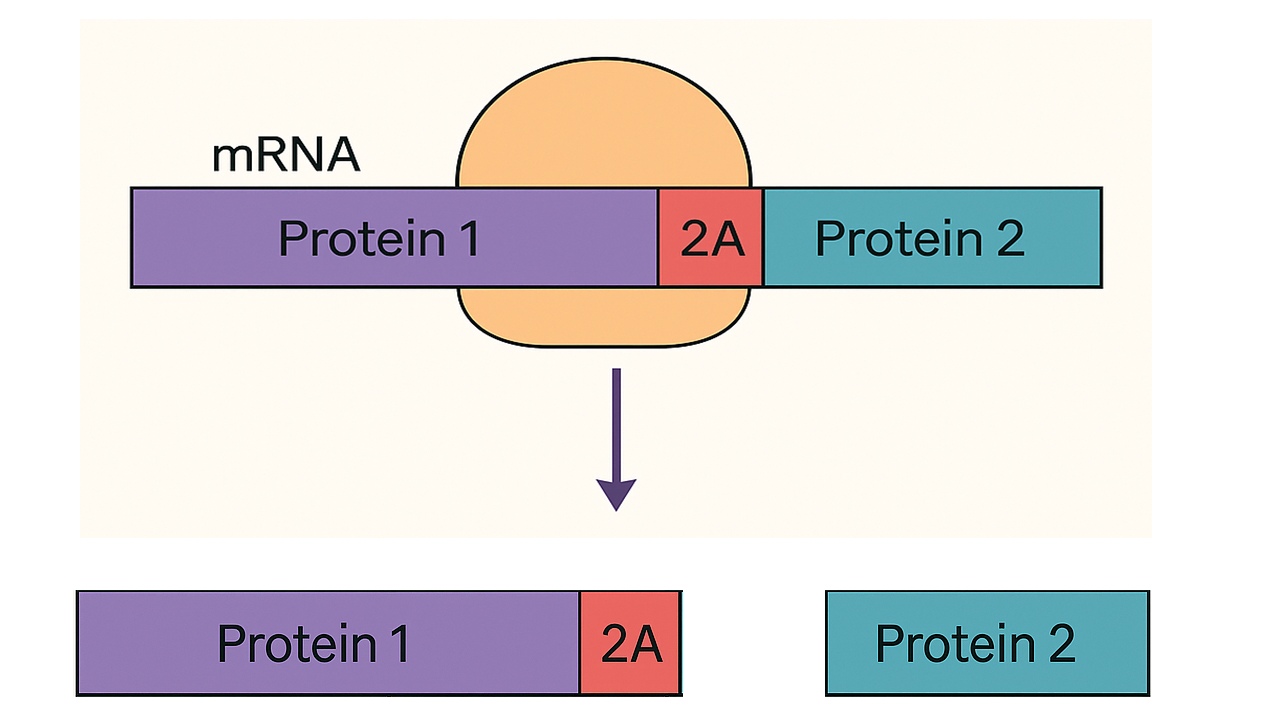
An illustration of 2A peptide function: when the CDS of a 2A peptide is inserted between two coding sequences, the nascent chain will be co-translationally separated due to ribosome skipping. 2A peptide remains attached to the first peptide.

2A peptides are a class of 18–22 aa-long peptides, which can induce ribosomal skipping during translation of a protein in a biological cell. These peptides share a core sequence motif of DxExNPGP, and are found in a wide range of viral families. 2A peptides can be introduced artificially to help generate polyproteins from a single ORF, by causing the ribosome to fail at making a peptide bond, and then resume translation.

The members of 2A peptides are named after the virus in which they have been first described. For example, F2A, the first described 2A peptide, is derived from foot-and-mouth disease virus. The name "2A" itself comes from the gene numbering scheme of this virus.

These peptides are also known as "self-cleaving" peptides, which is a known misnomer, because the missing peptide bond is never synthesized by the ribosome, and is thus not cleaved.

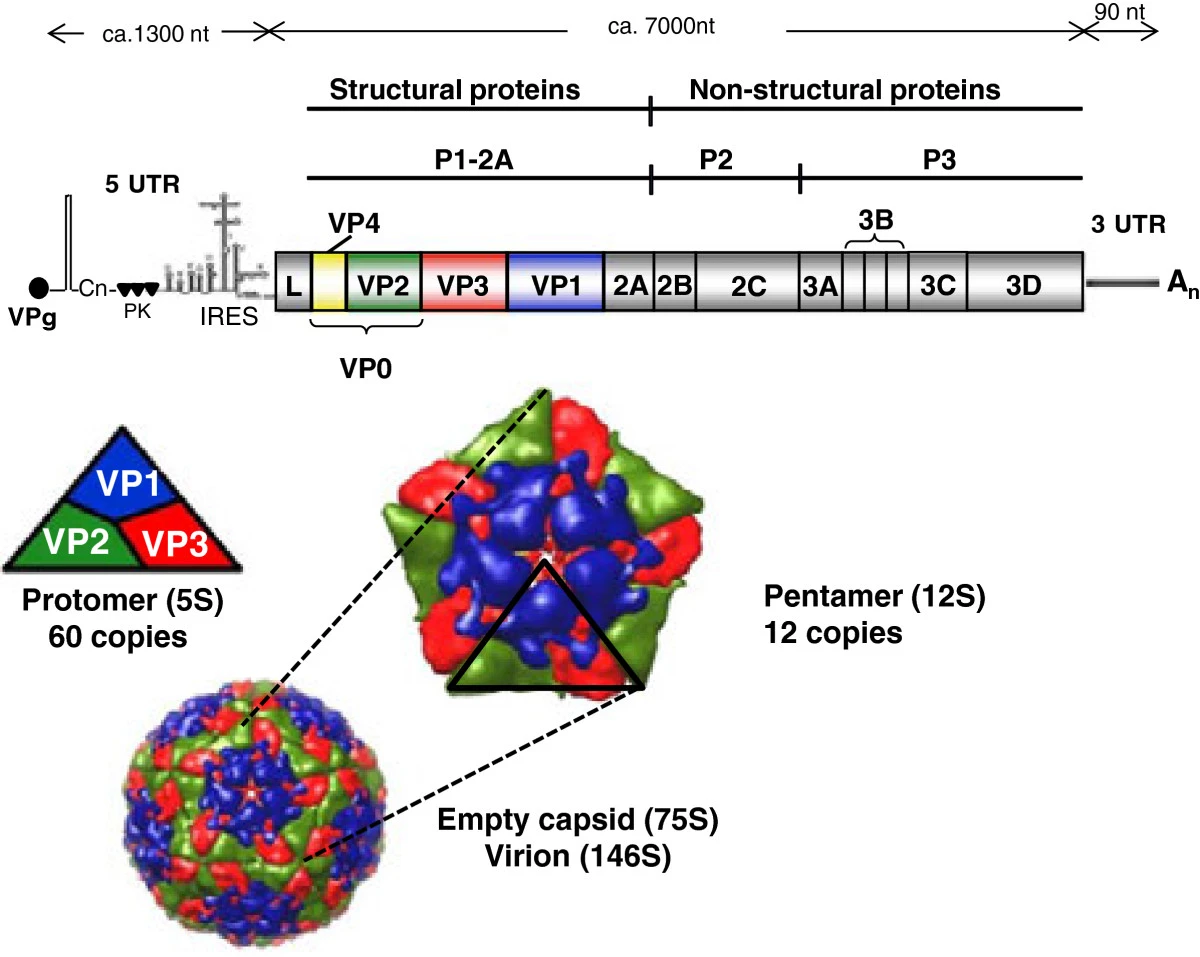
Genome organization and structure of foot-and-mouth disease virus

== 2A function in FMDV virus ==
Foot-and-mouth disease virus (FMDV) is a virus in the genus Aphthovirus that causes foot-and-mouth disease in cattle. As a member of the family Picornaviridae, FMDV is a positive-sense, single-stranded RNA virus.

2A is located between the capsid proteins and polymerases and proteases required for the capsid assembly in the late stages of the infection. The incomplete ribosomal skipping during the viral RNA translation mediated by the 2A results in "ribosome drop off" in some cases, after which the translation doesn't restart. This leads to a prevalence of the N-terminal proteins and allows for the increased production of the structural proteins relative to the non-structural proteins.

== Members ==
Four members of 2A peptides family are frequently used in life science research. They are P2A, E2A, F2A, and T2A. F2A is derived from foot-and-mouth disease virus 18; E2A is derived from equine rhinitis A virus; P2A is derived from porcine teschovirus-1 2A; T2A is derived from thosea asigna virus 2A.

The following table shows the sequences of four members of 2A peptides. Adding the optional linker “GSG” (Gly-Ser-Gly) on the N-terminal of a 2A peptide greatly helps with efficiency.

Name	Sequence
T2A	(GSG) EGRGSLLTCGDVEENPGP
P2A	(GSG) ATNFSLLKQAGDVEENPGP
E2A	(GSG) QCTNYALLKLAGDVESNPGP
F2A	(GSG) VKQTLNFDLLKLAGDVESNPGP

== Description ==
2A peptides trigger the ribosome to skip peptide bond formation between the glycine (G) and proline (P) near the C-terminus of the 2A peptide, resulting in the peptide located upstream of the 2A peptide having extra amino acids appended to its C-terminus while the protein downstream the 2A peptide will have an extra proline on its N-terminus. The exact molecular mechanism of 2A-peptide-mediated cleavage is still unknown. However, it is believed to involve ribosomal "skipping" of glycyl-prolyl peptide bond formation rather than true proteolytic cleavage.

== Application ==
In molecular biology, 2A peptides are used to express two separate proteins from a single open-reading frame. 2A peptides can be used when direct protein fusion does not work or is undesirable.

== Efficiency of bond-skipping ==
Different 2A peptides have different peptide-bond-skipping efficiencies, with T2A and P2A being the most efficient and F2A the least efficient. Therefore, up to 50% of F2A-linked proteins can in fact be produced as a fusion protein, which might cause some unpredictable outcomes, including a gain of function. One study reported that 2A sites cause the ribosome to fall off approximately 60% of the time, and that, together with ribosome read-through of about 10% for P2A and T2A, this results in reducing expression of the downstream peptide chain by about 70%. However, the level of drop-off detected in this study varied widely depending on the exact construct used, with some constructs showing little evidence of drop-off; furthermore, within a tri-cistronic transcript it reported a higher level of ribosome drop-off after one 2A sequence than after two 2As combined, which is at odds with a linear model of translation.

== See also ==
- IRES
- Recombinant DNA
