= Cripavirus internal ribosome entry site =

Cripavirus internal ribosome entry site (IRES)
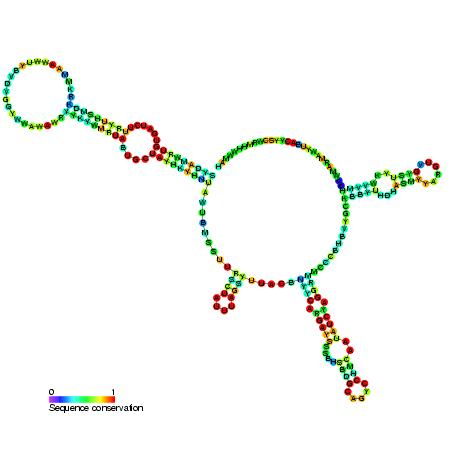
- Predicted secondary structure and sequence conservation of IRES_Cripavirus

Identifiers
- Symbol: IRES_Cripavirus
- Rfam: RF00458

Other data
- RNA type: Cis-reg; IRES
- Domain(s): Viruses
- GO: GO:0043022
- SO: SO:0000243
- PDB structures: PDBe

The Cripavirus internal ribosome entry site (CrPV IRES) is an RNA element required for the production of capsid proteins through ribosome recruitment to an intergenic region IRES (IGR IRES).

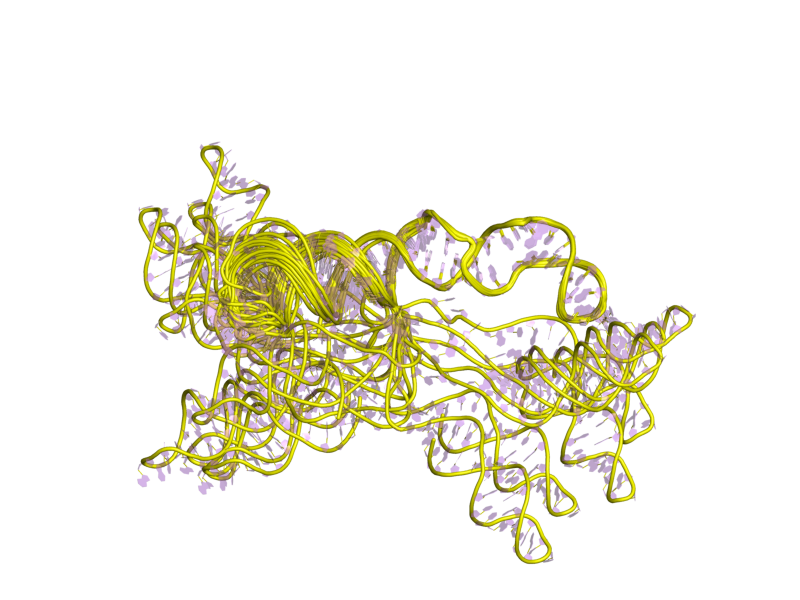
A 3D representation of a Cripavirus IRES. This is a view of the tertiary structure of the ribosome-bound cricket paralysis virus IRES RNA.

== See also ==
- Cricket paralysis virus
- Internal ribosome entry site (IRES)
