= Picornavirus internal ribosome entry site =

Picornavirus internal ribosome entry site (IRES)
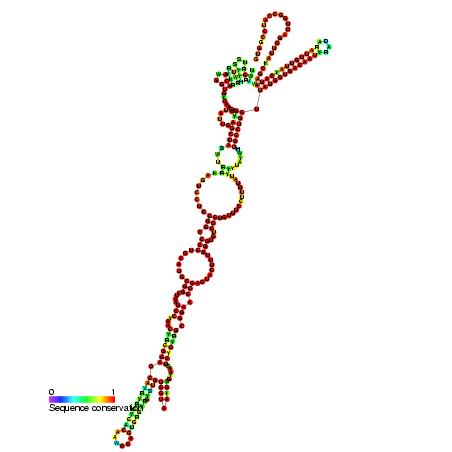
- Predicted secondary structure and sequence conservation of IRES_Picorna

Identifiers
- Symbol: IRES_Picorna
- Rfam: RF00229

Other data
- RNA type: Cis-reg; IRES
- Domain: Viruses
- GO: GO:0043022
- SO: SO:0000243
- PDB structures: PDBe

This family represents the Picornavirus internal ribosome entry site (IRES) element present in their 5' untranslated region. These elements were discovered in picornaviruses. They are cis-acting RNA sequences that adopt diverse three-dimensional structures, recruit the translation machinery and that often operate in association with specific RNA-binding proteins. IRES elements allow cap and end-independent translation of mRNA in the host cell. It has been found that La autoantigen (La) is required for Coxsackievirus B3 (CVB3) IRES-mediated translation, and it has been suggested that La may be required for the efficient translation of the viral RNA in the pancreas. Based on their secondary structure, picornavirus IRES are grouped into four main types. Type I comprises enteroand rhinovirus IRES and type II, those of cardio- and aphthovirus, among others. Type III is used to name hepatitis A IRES.
