= Infectious pancreatic necrosis birnavirus Vp4 peptidase =

Identifiers
- EC no.: 3.4.21.115

Databases
- IntEnz: IntEnz view
- BRENDA: BRENDA entry
- ExPASy: NiceZyme view
- KEGG: KEGG entry
- MetaCyc: metabolic pathway
- PRIAM: profile
- PDB structures: RCSB PDB PDBe PDBsum
Search
- PMC: articles
- PubMed: articles
- NCBI: proteins

Infectious pancreatic necrosis birnavirus Vp4 peptidase (EC 3.4.21.115, infectious pancreatic necrosis virus protease, IPNV Vp4 protease, IPNV Vp4 peptidase, NS protease, NS-associated protease, Vp4 protease) is an enzyme. This enzyme catalyses the following chemical reaction

Cleaves the (Ser/Thr)-Xaa-Ala-(Ser/Ala)-Gly motif in the polyprotein NH_{2}-pVP2-VP4-VP3-COOH of infectious pancreatic necrosis virus at the pVP2-VP4 and VP4-VP3 junctions

Infectious pancreatic necrosis virus is a birnavirus that causes an acute, contagious disease in young salmonid fish.
