= Internal ribosome entry site =

RNA element

An internal ribosome entry site, abbreviated IRES, is an RNA element that allows for translation initiation in a cap-independent manner, as part of the greater process of protein synthesis. Initiation of eukaryotic translation nearly always occurs at and is dependent on the 5' cap of mRNA molecules, where the translation initiation complex forms and ribosomes engage the mRNA. IRES elements, however, allow ribosomes to engage the mRNA and begin translation independently of the 5' cap.

== History ==
IRES sequences were first discovered in 1988 in the poliovirus (PV) and encephalomyocarditis virus (EMCV) RNA genomes in the laboratories of Nahum Sonenberg and Eckard Wimmer, respectively. They are described as distinct regions of RNA molecules that are able to recruit the eukaryotic ribosome to the mRNA. This process is also known as cap-independent translation. It has been shown that IRES elements have a distinct secondary or even tertiary structure, but similar structural features at the levels of either primary or secondary structure that are common to all IRES segments have not been reported to date.

Use of IRES sequences in molecular biology soon became common as a tool for expressing multiple genes from a single transcriptional unit in a genetic vector. In such vectors, translation of the first cistron is initiated at the 5' cap, and translation of any downstream cistron is enabled by an IRES element appended at its 5' end.

== Location ==
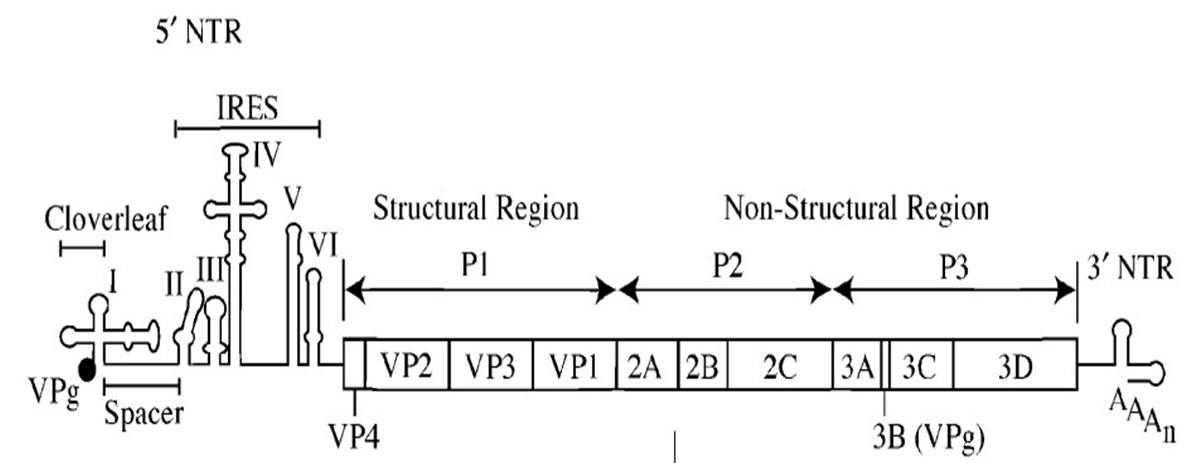
Poliovirus genome, including an IRES.

IRES elements are most commonly found in the 5' untranslated region, but may also occur elsewhere in mRNAs. The mRNA of viruses of the Dicistroviridae family possess two open reading frames (ORFs), and translation of each is directed by a distinct IRES. It has also been suggested that some mammalian cellular mRNAs also have IRESs, although this has been a matter of dispute. A number of these cellular IRES elements are located within mRNAs encoding proteins involved in stress survival, and other processes critical to survival. As of September 2009, there are 60 animal and 8 plant viruses reported to contain IRES elements and 115 mRNA sequences containing them as well.

== Activation ==
IRESs are often used by viruses as a means to ensure that viral translation is active when host translation is inhibited. These mechanisms of host translation inhibition are varied, and can be initiated by both virus and host, depending on the type of virus. However, in the case of most picornaviruses, such as poliovirus, this is accomplished by viral proteolytic cleavage of eIF4G so that it cannot interact with the 5'cap binding protein eIF4E. Interaction between these two eukaryotic initiation factors (eIFs) of the eIF4F complex is necessary for 40S ribosomal subunit recruitment to the 5' end of mRNAs, which is further thought to occur with mRNA 5'cap to 3' poly(A) tail loop formation. The virus may even use partially-cleaved eIF4G to aid in initiation of IRES-mediated translation.

Cells may also use IRESs to increase translation of certain proteins during mitosis and programmed cell death. In mitosis, the cell dephosphorylates eIF4E so that it has little affinity for the 5'cap. As a result, the 40S ribosomal subunit, and the translational machinery is diverted to IRES within the mRNA. Many proteins involved in mitosis are encoded by IRES mRNA. In programmed cell death, cleavage of eIF-4G, such as performed by viruses, decreases translation. Lack of essential proteins contributes to the death of the cell, as does translation of IRES mRNA sequences coding proteins involved in controlling cell death.

== Mechanism ==
To date, the mechanism of viral IRES function is better characterized than the mechanism of cellular IRES function, which is still a matter of debate. HCV-like IRESs directly bind the 40S ribosomal subunit to position their initiator codons are located in ribosomal P-site without mRNA scanning. These IRESs still use the eukaryotic initiation factors (eIFs) eIF2, eIF3, eIF5, and eIF5B, but do not require the factors eIF1, eIF1A, and the eIF4F complex. In contrast, picornavirus IRESs do not bind the 40S subunit directly, but are recruited instead through the eIF4G-binding site. Many viral IRES (and cellular IRES) require additional proteins to mediate their function, known as IRES trans-acting factors (ITAFs). The role of ITAFs in IRES function is still under investigation.

== Validity of Tests for IRES function ==
Testing of sequences for potential IRES function has generally relied on the use of bicistronic reporter assays. In these tests, a candidate IRES segment is introduced into a plasmid between two cistrons encoding two different reporter proteins. A promoter upstream of the first cistron drives transcription of both cistrons in a single mRNA. Cells are transfected with the plasmid and assays are subsequently performed to quantitate expression of the two reporters in the cells. An increase in the ratio of expression of the downstream reporter relative to the upstream reporter is taken as evidence for IRES activity in the test sequence. However, without characterization of the mRNA species produced from such plasmids, other explanations for the increase in this ratio cannot be ruled out. For example, there are multiple known cases of suspected IRES elements that were later reported as having promoter function. Unexpected splicing activity within several reported IRES elements have also been shown to be responsible for the apparent IRES function observed in bicistronic reporter tests. A promoter or splice acceptor within a test sequence can result in the production of monocistronic mRNA from which the downstream cistron is translated by conventional cap-dependent, rather than IRES-mediated, initiation. A later study that documented a variety of unexpected aberrant mRNA species arising from reporter plasmids revealed that splice acceptor sites can mimic both IRES and promoter elements in tests employing such plasmids, further highlighting the need for caution in the interpretation of reporter assay results in the absence of careful RNA analysis.

== Applications ==
IRES sequences are often used in molecular biology to co-express multiple genes under the control of the same promoter, thereby mimicking a polycistronic mRNA. Within the past decades, IRES sequences have been used to develop hundreds of genetically modified rodent animal models. The advantage of this technique is that molecular handling is improved. The disadvantage of using an IRES is that the expression for each subsequent gene is decreased.

Another viral element to establish polycistronic mRNA in eukaryotes are 2A-peptides. Here, the potential decrease in gene expression and the degree of incomplete separation of proteins is context dependent.

== Types ==
Internal ribosome entry sites in viral genomes
Virus	IRES
Poliovirus	Picornavirus IRES
Rhinovirus	Picornavirus IRES
Encephalomyocarditis virus	Picornavirus IRES
Foot-and-mouth disease virus	Aphthovirus IRES
Kaposi's sarcoma-associated herpesvirus (KSHV)	Kaposi's sarcoma-associated herpesvirus IRES
Hepatitis A virus	Hepatitis A IRES
Hepatitis C virus	Hepatitis C IRES
Classical swine fever virus	Pestivirus IRES
Bovine viral diarrhea virus	Pestivirus IRES
Friend murine leukemia	
Moloney murine leukemia (MMLV)	
Rous sarcoma virus	
Human immunodeficiency virus	
Plautia stali intestine virus	Cripavirus internal ribosome entry site
Cricket paralysis virus	Cripavirus internal ribosome entry site
Triatoma virus	Cripavirus internal ribosome entry site
Rhopalosiphum padi virus	Rhopalosiphum padi virus internal ribosome entry site (IRES)
Marek's disease virus MDV	5'Leader IRES and intercistronic IRES in the 1.8-kb family of immediate early transcripts (IRES)1

Internal ribosome entry sites in cellular mRNAs
Protein type	Proteins
Growth factors	Fibroblast growth factor (FGF-1 IRES and FGF-2 IRES), Platelet-derived growth factor B (PDGF/c-sis IRES), Vascular endothelial growth factor (VEGF IRES), Insulin-like growth factor 2 (IGF-II IRES)
Transcription factors	Antennapedia, Ultrabithorax, MYT-2, NF-κB repressing factor NRF, AML1/RUNX1, Gtx homeodomain protein
Translation factors	Eukaryotic initiation factor 4G (elF4G)a, Eukaryotic initiation factor 4Gl (elF4Gl)a, Eukaryotic translation initiation factor 4 gamma 2 (EIF4G2, DAP5)
Oncogenes	c-myc, L-myc, Pim-1, Protein kinase p58PITSLRE, p53
Transporters/receptors	Cationic amino acid transporter (SLC7A1, Cat-1), Nuclear form of Notch 2, Voltage-gated potassium channel, Muscarinic M2 receptor Muscarinic acetylcholine receptor M2
Activators of apoptosis	Apoptotic protease activating factor (Apaf-1)
Inhibitors of apoptosis	X-linked inhibitor of apoptosis (XIAP), HIAP2, Bcl-xL, Bcl-2
Proteins localized in neuronal dendrites	Activity-regulated cytoskeletal protein (ARC), α-subunit of calcium calmodulin dependent kinase II dendrin, Microtubule-associated protein 2 (MAP2), neurogranin (RC3), Amyloid precursor protein
Others	Immunoglobulin heavy chain binding protein (BiP), Heat shock protein 70, β-subunit of mitochondrial H+-ATP synthase, Ornithine decarboxylase, connexins 32 and 43, HIF-1α, APC

== See also ==
- Ribosome binding site
- Ribosome shunting
- RAN translation
