= UTRdb =

UTRdb 2.0

Content
- Description: sequences and regulatory motifs of untranslated regions of eukaryotic mRNAs
- Organisms: Eukaryotes

Contact
- Laboratory: Università degli Studi di Bari, Piazza Umberto I, 1, 70121 Bari BA, Italy
- Authors: Claudio Lo Giudice
- Primary citation: Lo Giudice & al. (2023)

Access
- Website: http://utrdb.cloud.ba.infn.it/utrdb/

UTRdb 2.0 is an updated version of the specialized database UTRdb, which focuses on the 5' and 3' untranslated regions (UTRs) of eukaryotic mRNAs. These UTRs play essential roles in the post-transcriptional regulation of gene expression by influencing various processes, including nucleo-cytoplasmic mRNA transport, translation efficiency, subcellular localization, and mRNA stability. Since its launch in 1996, UTRdb has been a valuable resource for researchers studying UTR sequences and their functional implications.

== Content and features ==
UTRdb 2.0 contains a comprehensive collection of over 26 million entries, derived from more than 6 million genes across 573 species. The database is enriched with a curated set of functional annotations to enhance the understanding of UTR function. These annotations include:

- CAGE tags: marking the completeness of 5' UTRs
- PolyA signals: indicating the completeness of 3' UTRs
- uORFs and IRES: annotating upstream open reading frames (uORFs) and internal ribosome entry sites (IRES) in 5' UTRs
- miRNA targets: annotating experimentally validated miRNA targets in 3' UTRs
- Evolutionarily conserved blocks: identifying conserved regions across species
- Rfam motifs: recognizing RNA motifs associated with function
- ADAR-mediated RNA editing: annotating RNA editing events mediated by the ADAR enzyme
- m6A modifications: marking mRNA modifications related to N6-methyladenosine

== Web interface and access ==
UTRdb 2.0 provides a flexible web interface that allows users to select and retrieve subsets of UTRs based on various criteria. This tool offers comprehensive download options to access the data for further analysis.
