= Drosophila C virus =

Virus classification
- (unranked): Virus
- Realm: Riboviria
- Kingdom: Orthornavirae
- Phylum: Pisuviricota
- Class: Pisoniviricetes
- Order: Picornavirales
- Family: Dicistroviridae
- Genus: Cripavirus
- Species: Cripavirus drosophilae

Species of virus

Drosophila C virus (DCV) belongs to the genus Cripavirus and was previously thought to be a member of the virus family Picornaviridae; it has since been classified as belonging to the Dicistroviridae. It is a single stranded positive sense RNA virus of approximately 9300 nucleotides and it contains two open reading frames. The virus particles are 30 nm in diameter and are made up of approximately 30% of RNA and 70% protein. The virus capsid is composed of three major polypeptides and two minor polypeptides.

Drosophila C virus was first discovered in the early 1970s in a French strain of Drosophila melanogaster, but can also infect other Drosophila species in laboratory settings. The virus is transmitted by feeding and affects survival. However, experimental evidence has shown that when injected into adult flies the virus is pathogenic as it causes the adult flies to die within 3–4 days. Antiviral RNAi has been shown to be an important host defence against DCV, and DCV encodes a viral suppressor of RNAi that sequesters double-stranded RNA to prevent antiviral RNAi targeting the virus. Drosophila that are infected with Drosophila C virus develop more quickly, the females have a greater number of ovarioles than uninfected flies. Whilst based on this evidence it has been suggested DCV is a beneficial virus, this ignores the fact that the virus kills flies in only a few days (so total fitness in infected flies is still reduced), and any changes in development time or ovariole number likely represent a host life history shift (parasite-induced fecundity compensation). Further support for host fecundity compensation following DCV infection comes from work showing that this response varies with fly genetic background, with some fly lines showing increased fecundity following infection, while others show a fecundity reduction. Infection with Drosophila C virus can also increase the mortality rate within a Drosophila population.
