= Aparavirus internal ribosome entry site =

The Aparavirus internal ribosome entry site (IRES) is a structured RNA element in the intergenic region of Aparavirus genomes. It directs the production of viral structural proteins by recruiting host ribosomes independently of a messenger RNA 5′ cap. Examples include the intergenic region IRESs of Taura syndrome virus (TSV) and Israeli acute paralysis virus (IAPV). These RNAs initiate translation without canonical translation initiation factors or an initiator transfer RNA (tRNA).

== Background ==
Dicistrovirus, which includes Aparavirus, Cripavirus and Triatovirus genera contain two main open reading frames. The first encodes nonstructural proteins involved in viral replication, while the second encodes the precursor of the structural proteins that form the viral capsid. The IRES lies between these coding regions and directs translation of the second open reading frame.

== Structure and classification ==
Aparavirus IRESs contain three pseudoknots, termed PKI, PKII and PKIII. PKI mimics the interaction between a tRNA anticodon and a messenger RNA codon in the ribosome. A characteristic additional stem-loop within PKI, called stem-loop III in IAPV, distinguishes Aparavirus IRESs from the related Cripavirus IRESs.

This group is described as type II within the Dicistrovirus IRES classification. In the broader classification used by Abaeva and colleagues, TSV-like IRESs are designated type VIb.

== Function ==
The IRES substitutes RNA structure for components normally needed to initiate protein synthesis. PKI initially occupies the ribosomal decoding site, or A site. Eukaryotic elongation factor 2 (eEF2) promotes movement of PKI into the P site, bringing the first protein-coding codon into the A site, where it can be decoded by an aminoacyl-tRNA. Translation therefore begins without an AUG initiation codon or an initiator methionine tRNA.

Cryo-electron microscopy of the TSV IRES revealed several intermediate conformations during this movement. The RNA changes from an extended conformation to a bent conformation and then extends again, suggesting an inchworm-like mechanism coupled to ribosomal subunit rotation and movement of the small-subunit head.

Structural studies of the IAPV IRES showed binding to both isolated small ribosomal subunits and complete ribosomes. Its RNA structure mimics aspects of a ribosome containing tRNAs in hybrid positions during translation. Additional contacts involving stem-loop III help stabilize the complex and restrict rotation of the small subunit.

== Related IRESs ==
The Halastavi árva virus IGR IRES provides a contrasting mechanism. It lacks a ribosome-binding domain present in previously characterized dicistrovirus IGR IRESs and binds assembled ribosomes with PKI already positioned in the P site. This allows decoding of the first codon without the preliminary eEF2-dependent movement required by TSV-like IRESs. Abaeva and colleagues designated this distinct group type VIc.
