= Linepithema humile virus 1 =

Virus classification
- (unranked): Virus
- Realm: Riboviria
- Kingdom: Orthornavirae
- Phylum: Pisuviricota
- Class: Pisoniviricetes
- Order: Picornavirales
- Family: Dicistroviridae
- Genus: Aparavirus
- Virus: Linepithema humile virus 1

Virus

Linepithema humile virus-1 (LHUV-1) is a novel virus discovered to be actively replicating within the invasive Argentine ant (Linepithema humile) species. The Argentine ant is extremely invasive across the globe, invading all continents besides Antarctica with their mega-colony. The invasiveness of the ants is allowing the distribution of this virus, among others, into vulnerable honey bee populations which may be responsible for the overall colony collapse.

== Taxonomy ==
1. ICTV does not include Linepithema humile virus 1
2. NCBI does include it, but puts it under unclassified viruses Disclaimer: The NCBI taxonomy database is not an authoritative source for nomenclature or classification of viruses.
3. Article 1, "Single-stranded RNA viruses infecting the invasive Argentine ant, Linepithema humile" states it is part of genus Aparavirus of family Dicistroviridae
4. Article 2, "Invasive ants carry novel viruses in their new range and form reservoirs for a honeybee pathogen" also states it is in family Dicistroviridae. While the article does not state that it is in genus Aparavirus, a clade it is part of contains almost every species that article 1's phylogeny chart contains.

== Virus prevalence and distribution ==
Linepithema humile virus-1 (LHUV-1) was found to be introduced by Argentine ants into New Zealand and Australia. Aside from the ants, the virus has also been reported in other species worldwide such as honeybees. Argentine ants host and act as a reservoir of Deformed wing virus (DWV), which is an agent implicated of honeybee deaths. A correlation and direct interaction between the honeybees and the Argentine ants occurs during invasion and raiding of the beehives. The DWV sequences isolated from New Zealand were found to be similar to strains from local bee and wasp populations. This suggests that ants, wasps, and bees share these pathogen strains.

It was found that when an invasion of an exotic species occurs and becomes abundant, such as the Argentine ant, they tend to have a considerable impact through their ability to become reservoirs and hosts for important pathogens. Ants from sites where ants interacted with bees had the highest viral loads. Where ants did not interact with bees, we found a lower prevalence of DWV relative to other viruses.

Researchers found that Linepithema humile virus-1 (LHUV-1) was detected in sample sites from the n1000 contig sequence in Argentina, Australia, and less than half of the sites tested from New Zealand. Additional ant samples were used from New Zealand in order to examine viruses previously observed in bees, ants, and other insects and determine the correlation among viruses groups. Viruses IAPV, KBV, ABVP, DWV, SINV-1, and SINV-2, with only DWV sequences being found in honeybees and common wasps. In addition, both the DWV and LHUV-1 negative strands were detected showing that these two viruses are actively replicating in Argentine ants.

Presence of DWV and LHUV-1 were detected and confirmed by using molecular methods including RT-PCR and Sanger Sequencing. Data produced from Sanger Sequencing were identical to that of the RNA metagenome contig, n6409, which is from LHUV-1. A single New Zealand queen Argentine ant worker was positive for LHUV-1 with viral replication, but no DWV. LHUV-1 and DWV were both observed to be replicating in the Argentine ants. LHUV-1 and DWV viruses were both reported to be most likely responsible for parasitizing the ants rather than being vectored particles. Prevalence of these two viruses has been shown instrumental in the decline of Argentine ant populations and may be a departure point for future biocontrol development.

== Genomics ==
In order to address the issue of LHUV-1 prevalence, the L. humile genome was sequenced. The genomic assembly was found to be missing cox7a which was lost from the genome. In the genes found to be specific to L. humile, 99 terms were enriched including olfactory receptors, peptidases aiding in production of venom, genes associated with lipid activity involved in cuticular hydrocarbon (CHC) synthesis or catabolism, and DNA methylation genes.

The LHUV-1 virus was found to contain fragments of other viral families within its genome. Notably, the virus maintains single copy Dnmt genes that are able to undergo DNA methylation using a toolkit. In addition to this, occurrences of independent radiation exist within various lineages of LHUV-1 genome. It was reported that ancestral genes tended to proliferate, resulting in the activation of genes such as major royal jelly protein-like genes (MRJPLS), in order to evolve and adapt to new selective pressures.

Researchers found that Dinucleotide transition SNPs, in regards to DNA methylation, were 10 times more prevalent in L. humile. Moreover, the SNP data was concluded to be comparable to other transversions. In order to investigate active replication of DWV and LHUV-1, modified RT-PCR was used to detect the RNA negative strands of both viruses (DWV and LHUV-1). The presence of contig n6409 sequence was confirmed via Sanger sequencing. This allowed for phylogenetic analysis to position the contig with other dicistroviruses.
