= TSV =

TSV may refer to:

- Tab-separated values, an example of delimiter-separated values
- Two-step verification
- Through-silicon via, a vertical electrical connection passing completely through the silicon substrate of a wafer or die
- Time Space Visualiser, a Doctor Who fanzine
- Taura syndrome virus
- Tobacco streak virus, a plant pathogenic virus
- Townsville Airport (IATA code), a major Australian regional airport
- TSV (TV channel), a TV channel in the unrecognized state of Transnistria
- Turn- und Sportverein ("Gymnastics and Sports club"), a common club name prefix of sports in Germany and Austria
- Transport Stream Video, a video file format as in MPEG transport stream
