= Taura River =

River of Ecuador

Coordinates: 2.4745°S 79.7495°W

Location
- Country: Ecuador

The Taura River is a river of Ecuador. It flows into the Churute Estuary in the Gulf of Guayaquil. It gives its name to the shrimp disease Taura syndrome, which was first described in shrimp farms along the river.

== See also ==
- List of rivers of Ecuador
