= Triatoma virus =

Virus classification
- (unranked): Virus
- Realm: Riboviria
- Kingdom: Orthornavirae
- Phylum: Pisuviricota
- Class: Pisoniviricetes
- Order: Picornavirales
- Family: Dicistroviridae
- Genus: Triatovirus
- Species: Triatovirus triatomae

Species of virus

Triatoma virus (TrV) is a virus belonging to the insect virus family Dicistroviridae. Within this family, there are currently 3 genera and 15 species of virus. Triatoma virus belongs to the genus Triatovirus. It is non-enveloped and its genetic material is positive-sense, single-stranded RNA. The natural hosts of triatoma virus are invertebrates. TrV is a known pathogen to Triatoma infestans, the major vector of Chagas disease in Argentina which makes triatoma virus a major candidate for biological vector control as opposed to chemical insecticides. Triatoma virus was first discovered in 1984 when a survey of pathogens of triatomes was conducted in the hopes of finding potential biological control methods for T. infestans.

== Viral classification ==
TrV is a positive-sense, single-stranded RNA virus. It belongs to virus Group IV. Virus groups are based on the Baltimore classification system. The Baltimore classification system is based on the method of viral mRNA synthesis utilized by the virus. TrV is in the genus Triatovirus in the family Dicistroviridae and the order Picornavirales.

== Structure ==
The protein capsid of the virus is 30 nm in diameter. The capsid has icosahedral symmetry and a pseudo-triangulation number of 3. By weight, 65% of the virion is protein and 35% is RNA. The genetic material of TrV consists of a single strand of positive-sense RNA with a relative molecular weight of 3 million. The viral particle also contains four polypeptides with molecular weights of 39, 37, 33, and 45 kDa, respectively. Four structural proteins comprise the capsid: VP1, VP2, VP3, and VP4. VP1, VP2, and VP3 compose the main structural units of the capsid while VP4 is not icosahedrally ordered within the capsid. This is possibly due to residues around the 5-fold axis in the VP1, VP2, and VP3 subunit that are not complementary to the corresponding residues in the structure of VP4.

== Genome ==
Triatoma virus has a positive-sense, single-stranded RNA genome that functions like an mRNA molecule so it can be directly translated by host cell machinery. Excluding the poly-A tail, the genome of TrV is 9010 nucleotides long. With the poly-A tail, the genome is approximately 10 kb long. The relative percentages of each base are 28±7% adenine, 16±1% cytosine, 19±8% guanine and 35±4% uracil. The GC content of the genome is approximately 35% and the AU content of the genome is approximately 63%. This high AU content is typical of insect viruses that are similar to picornavirus. The genome contains two large open reading frames (ORF). The open reading frames do not overlap. The predicted amino acid sequence of ORF 1 contains motifs similar to RNA-dependent RNA-polymerase, cysteine proteases, and RNA helicase. Positive-stranded RNA viruses do not have RNA-dependent RNA-polymerases in their capsid so they encode for them in their genomes and rely on the cell's translation mechanisms produce RNA-dependent RNA-polymerase. ORF 2 contains the sequences for four structural proteins VP1, VP2, VP3, and minor protein VP4 which will be the main components of the viral capsid.

== Replication cycle ==
=== Entry ===
Entry of the viral genome into the cell begins with the viral particle binding to a specific receptor on the outside of the cell. Once bound to a receptor, the capsid needs to undergo conformational changes that allow the release of the RNA genome into the cell. The conformation changes that occur with TrV are most likely the flipping open of pentameric subunits of the capsid at the two-fold axis while the subunit is still attached at another interface. The RNA would then be released from the capsid and enter the cell. Once the RNA is released, the pentameric subunits close, forming the now-empty capsid. The small protein, VP4, contained within the capsid also plays a role in genome release by affecting the permeability of the host cell membrane. Discrete pores on the capsid surface allow VP4 permeabilization activity on the membrane similar to viroporins. This assists in genome entry and possibly in further cell entry steps.

=== Replication and transcription ===
Little is known about the replication mechanisms of dicistroviruses but it is likely that they use a mechanism that is very similar to picornaviruses.

The general picornavirus replication mechanism begins with the cloverleaf-shaped structure at the 5’ end of the RNA genome is bound by the 3CD protein. 3CD functions as an RNA-dependent RNA-polymerase. 3CD then interacts with another protein that binds the poly(A) tail. This circularizes the RNA and allows RNA polymerase to generate negative-sense RNA from the 3’ end while also being able to generate positive-sense RNA from the 5’ end. Translation of the genome is regulated by the binding of 3CD initially to the 5’ UTR. This removes ribosomes from the RNA and makes it solely a replication template. RNA viruses must have a regulatory mechanism that controls whether the genome is transcribed or translated so that it not only produces new viral capsids but also genetic material to fill those capsids.

=== Assembly and release ===
The portion of the genome that encodes nonstructural proteins must be coexpressed with the portion of the genome that produces the structural proteins of the capsid in order to produce functioning viral particles. Without expression of the nonstructural portion of the genome, particles are produced but they are devoid of genetic material. P1, which is the main structural unit of the capsid made up of VP1, VP2, and VP3 proteins, must be cleaved prior to capsid assembly otherwise it will combine with other precursor P1 molecules to form non-isometric assemblages in the cytoplasm that quickly accumulate in the cell. These assemblages are also much larger than the typical TrV capsid. It is uncertain whether or not the P1 precursor assemblages are precursors themselves to the final capsid form or if they are dead-end structures. New viral particles are assembled in the cytoplasm and are released upon cell lysis. Cell lysis is triggered by viroporin production instigated by the virus which increases the permeability of the cell membrane and disrupts the cell membrane.

== Tropism ==
Triatoma virus replicates in the abdomen of triatomines, specifically in epithelial intestine cells. This leads to the delayed development of the individual and in most cases, death. TrV can be transmitted to humans through the bite of T. infestans when they blood feed but the virus is unable to replicate in human cells. TrV has also shown to not be able to replicate in the cells of mice under experimental conditions.

TrV is transmitted between individuals of T. infestans in two different ways. The first mode of transmission is a form of horizontal transmission, the fecal-oral route. When T. infestans blood feed or shortly after feeding, they defecate and shed viral particles. Healthy individuals who are feeding near the infected individuals could be infected themselves by piercing the now infected surface. The second mode of transmission is through vertical transmission, specifically through transovarial transmission, meaning that an infected female can pass the virus to her offspring. This is why a majority of offspring of infected females do not survive past the nymph stage.

== Uses ==
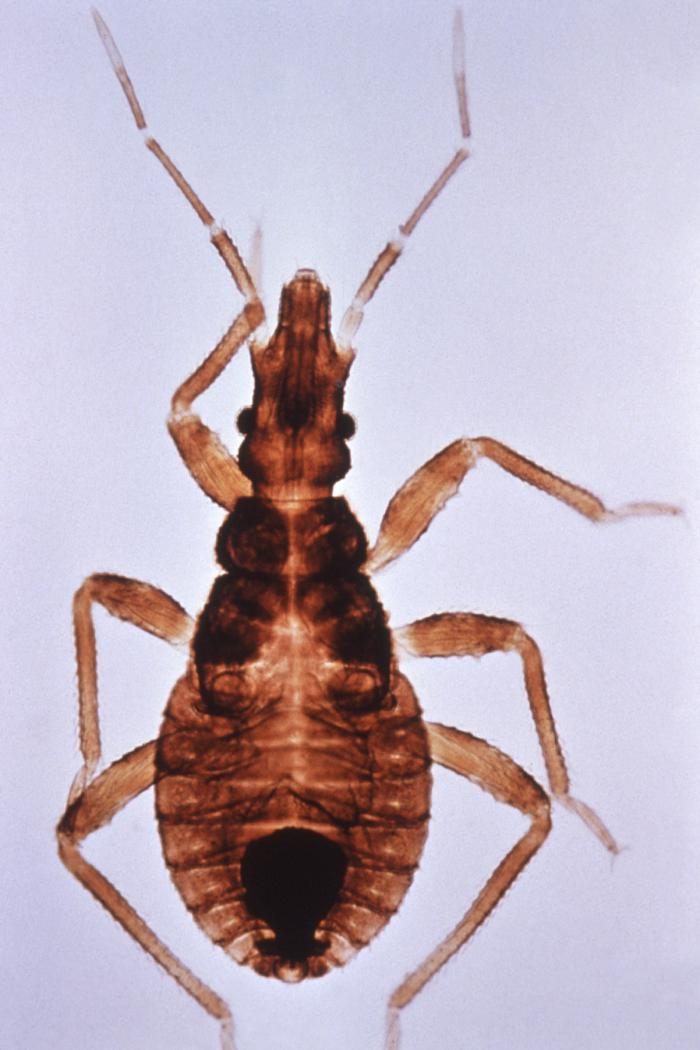
Triatoma infestans, the vector of Trypanosoma cruzi which causes Chagas disease, is susceptible to Triatoma virus infection. Triatoma virus is a promising biological vector control agent for this species.

Chagas disease is caused by Trypanosoma cruzi. About seven to eight million people are estimated to have Chagas disease in Latin America and there is no known vaccine for the disease. The vector that carries Trypanosoma cruzi is the insect species Triatoma infestans, also known as "kissing bugs". Because it is a pathogen to T. infestans, Triatoma virus has been investigated as an alternate method to control T. infestans population size and their ability transmit T. cruzi. The current method to control T. infestans populations is the use of chemical insecticides but due to concerns over environmental impacts, insecticide resistance in native populations, and health concerns in humans, wild and domestic animals, viral vector controls are being investigated.

Hesitations in early uses of Triatoma virus as a biological vector control agent were present because of its relation to other picornaviruses that are mammal pathogens. After the sequence of TrV was analyzed, however, it was concluded that it is different enough from picornavirus that it should belong to entirely new family of viruses that only infected insects, Dicistroviridae. The most notable genetic difference between the two categories of viruses is the presence of only one open reading frame in typical picornaviruses and two distinct open reading frames in viruses like triatoma virus. Triatoma virus has since been confirmed to be unable to replicate in many mammal species by experimental testing, specifically including humans, so it does not pose a risk to humans or wild or domesticated animals if used as a biological vector control agent.

Triatoma virus infection leads to a 97.6% mortality rate in nymphs and inhibited molting in laboratory colonies. TrV causes delayed development and death in infected individuals. In a survey of wild populations of T. infestans in Argentina, the virus was only present in 10% of the population. Populations of T. infestans in the Dry Chaco ecoregion of Argentina have already been shown to be an effective, possible target for TrV vector control methods and other populations within Argentina have been identified as possible targets in theoretical models.

After replication of TrV, T. infestans intestinal cells have shown to be more adherent to T. cruzi and are less likely to shed the pathogen for Chagas disease.
