= Nosema ceranae =

Scientific classification
- Kingdom: Fungi
- Division: Rozellomycota
- Class: Microsporidia
- Family: Nosematidae
- Genus: Nosema
- Species: N. ceranae

Binomial name
- Nosema ceranae (Fries et al., 1996)

Species of microsporidian

Nosema ceranae is a microsporidian, a small, unicellular parasite that mainly affects Apis cerana, the Asiatic honey bee. Along with Nosema apis, it causes the disease nosemosis, the most widespread of the diseases of adult honey bees. N. ceranae can remain dormant as a long-lived spore which is resistant to temperature extremes and dehydration. This fungus has been shown to act in a synergistic fashion with diverse insecticides such as fipronil or neonicotinoids, by increasing the toxicity of pesticides for bees, leading to higher bee mortality. It may thus play an indirect role in colony collapse disorder. In addition, the interaction between fipronil and N. ceranae induces changes in male physiology leading to sterility.

== Range ==
Nosema ceranae was first described in 1996 and was identified as a disease of Apis mellifera in 2004 in Taiwan. Since its emergence in honeybees, N. ceranae has been identified in bumblebee species in South America, China, and England where infection studies indicate N. ceranae has a higher virulence in bumblebees than honeybees.

Researchers in Spain have analysed samples of Apis mellifera, the European honey bee, mostly sent from colonies suffering unexpected decreases in bee population per hive or lower honey production, as reported by the beekeepers during the last two to three years. In 2004, 90% of some 3,000 samples had positive results for N. ceranae. In 2005, of 800 samples, 97% had positive results. During 2006, both France and Germany have detected the disease and recognized the genetic sequence of N. ceranae in their respective territories. In the United States, N. ceranae has been detected in honey bees from Nebraska, Wisconsin, Arkansas, New York, and South Dakota using PCR of the 16S gene. In New York, N. ceranae was detected in 49 counties, and of the 1200 honey bee samples collected, 528 (44%) were positive for Nosema, from which, PCR analysis of 371 spore positive samples revealed that 96% were N. ceranae, 3% had both N. ceranae and N. apis, and 1% had N. apis only.

== Effects on bees ==
This pathogen has been tentatively linked to colony collapse disorder, a phenomenon reported primarily from the United States, since fall of 2006. Highly preliminary evidence of N. ceranae was reported in a few hives in the Central Valley area of California. "Tests of genetic material taken from a "collapsed colony" in Merced County point to a once-rare microbe that previously affected only Asian bees but might have evolved into a strain lethal to those in Europe and the United States." The researcher did not, however, believe this was conclusive evidence of a link to CCD; "We don't want to give anybody the impression that this thing has been solved." A USDA bee scientist has similarly stated, "while the parasite nosema ceranae may be a factor, it cannot be the sole cause. The fungus has been seen before, sometimes in colonies that were healthy." In early 2009, Higes et al. reported an association between CCD and N. ceranae was established free of confounding factors, and that weakened colonies treated with fumagillin recovered.

News articles published in October 2010 quoted researchers who had discovered that Nosema fungus had joined with a previously unsuspected virus, invertebrate iridescent virus, or IIV6, dealing test bee colonies a lethal blow. Neither the fungus nor the virus alone kills all the test group, but the two combined do. Both the fungus and the virus are found with high frequency in hives that have suffered CCD. Final testing is in progress with field tests on colonies.

N. ceranae and N. apis have similar lifecycles, but they differ in spore morphology. Spores of N. ceranae seem to be slightly smaller under the light microscope and the number of polar filament coils is between 20 and 23, rather than the more than 30 often seen in N. apis.

The disease afflicts adult bees and depopulation occurs with consequent losses in honey production. One does not detect symptoms of diarrhea as in N. apis. However, the infection damages the bee's midgut, resulting in the necrosis of intestinal tissue. This impairs the bee's ability to digest food and absorb nutrients.

The most significant difference between the two types is how quickly N. ceranae can cause a colony to die. Bees can die within 8 days after exposure to N. ceranae, a finding not yet confirmed by other researchers. The forager caste seems the most affected, leaving the colony presumably to forage, but never returning. This results in a reduced colony consisting mostly of nurse bees with their queen, a state very similar to that seen in CCD. Little advice on treatment is available, but it has been suggested that the most effective control of N. ceranae is the antibiotic fumagillin as recommended for N. apis. The genome of N. ceranae was sequenced in 2009. This should help scientists trace its migration patterns, establish how it became dominant, and help measure the spread of infection by enabling diagnostic tests and treatments to be developed.

== Treatment ==
N. ceranae is apparently released from the suppressive effects of fumagillin at higher concentrations than that of N. apis. At fumagillin concentrations that continue to impact honey bee physiology, N. ceranae thrives and doubles its spore production. The current application protocol for fumagillin may exacerbate N. ceranae infection rather than suppress it. Fumagillin application should be a major cause of N. ceranae dominance in this time.
