= Hibernation =

Physiological state of dormant inactivity in order to pass the winter season

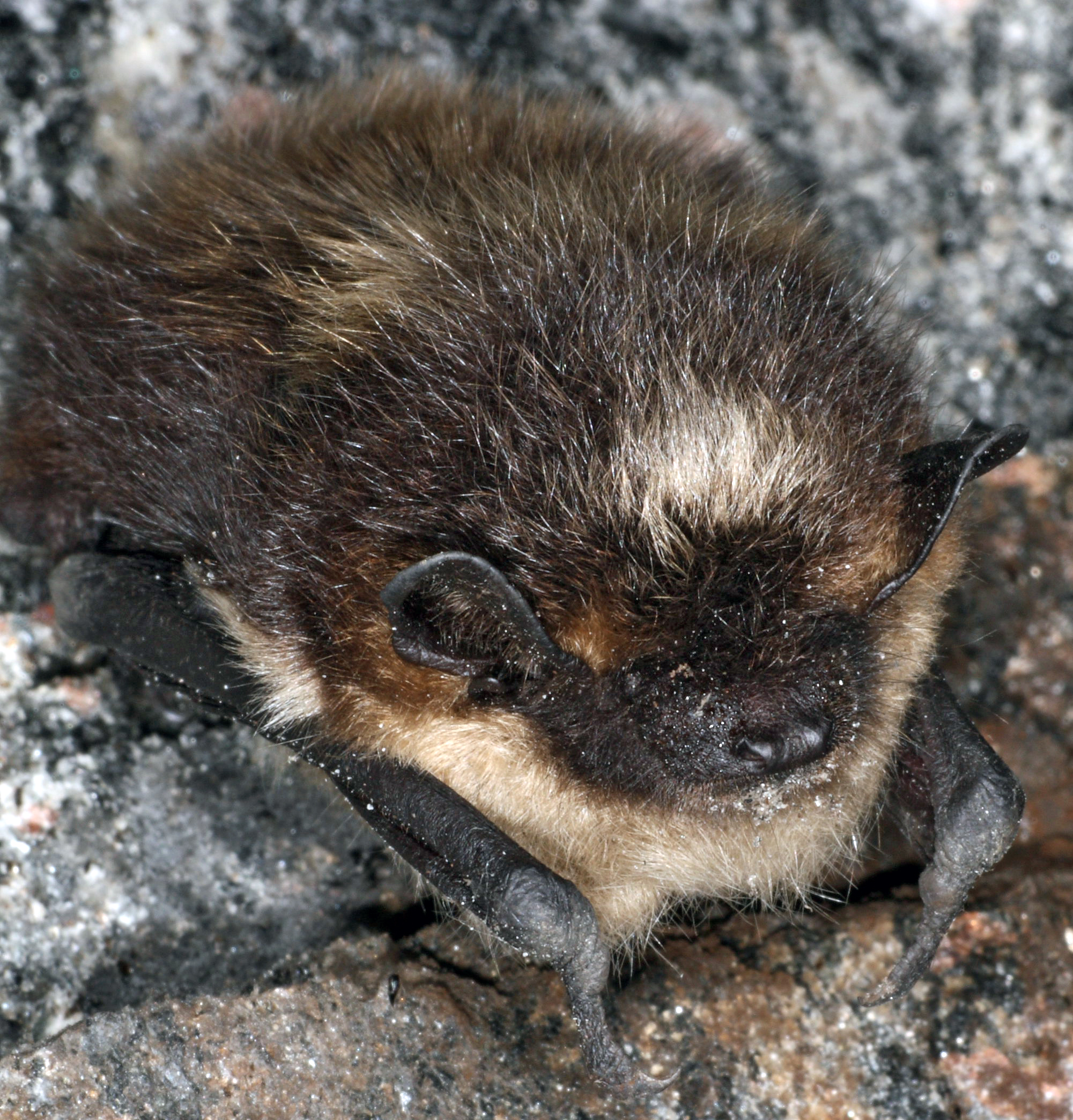
Northern bat hibernating in Norway

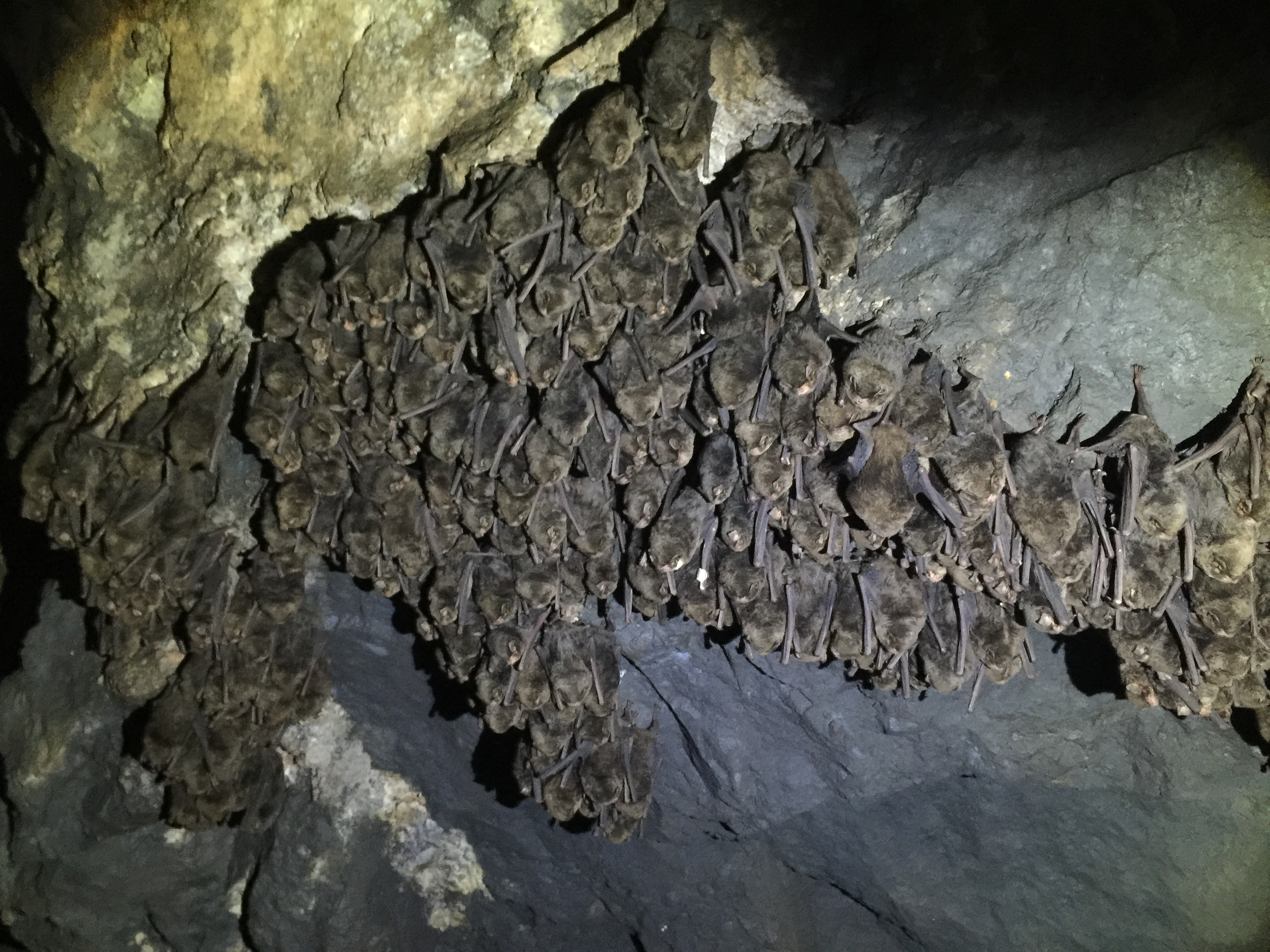
Bats hibernating in a silver mine

Hibernation is a state of minimal activity and metabolic reduction entered by some animal species. Hibernation is a seasonal heterothermy characterized by low body-temperature, slow breathing and heart-rate, and low metabolic rate. It is most commonly used to pass through winter months – called overwintering.

Although traditionally reserved for "deep" hibernators such as rodents, the term has been redefined to include animals such as bears and is now applied based on active metabolic suppression rather than any absolute decline in body temperature. Many experts believe that the processes of daily torpor and hibernation form a continuum and use similar mechanisms. The equivalent during the summer months is aestivation.

Hibernation functions to conserve energy when sufficient food is not available. To achieve this energy saving, an endothermic animal decreases its metabolic rate and thereby its body temperature. Hibernation may last days, weeks, or months—depending on the species, ambient temperature, time of year, and the individual's body-condition. Before entering hibernation, animals need to store enough energy to last through the duration of their dormant period, possibly as long as an entire winter. Larger species become hyperphagic, eating a large amount of food and storing the energy in their bodies in the form of fat deposits. In many small species, food caching replaces eating and becoming fat.

Some species of mammals hibernate while gestating young, which are born either while the mother hibernates or shortly afterwards. For example, female black bears go into hibernation during the winter months in order to give birth to their offspring. The pregnant mothers significantly increase their body mass prior to hibernation, and this increase is further reflected in the weight of the offspring. The fat accumulation enables them to provide a sufficiently warm and nurturing environment for their newborns. During hibernation, they subsequently lose 15–27% of their pre-hibernation weight by using their stored fats for energy.

Ectothermic animals also undergo periods of metabolic suppression and dormancy, which in many invertebrates is referred to as diapause. Some researchers and members of the public use the term brumate to describe winter dormancy of reptiles, but the more general term hibernation is believed adequate to refer to any winter dormancy. Many insects, such as the wasp Polistes exclamans and the beetle Bolitotherus, exhibit periods of dormancy which have often been referred to as hibernation, despite their ectothermy. Botanists may use the term "seed hibernation" to refer to a form of seed dormancy.

== Mammals ==
There are multiple definitions for terms that describe hibernation in mammals, and different mammal clades hibernate differently. The following subsections discuss the terms obligate and facultative hibernation. The last two sections point out in particular primates, none of whom were thought to hibernate until recently, and bears, whose winter torpor had been contested as not being "true hibernation" during the late 20th century, since it is dissimilar from hibernation seen in rodents.

=== Obligate hibernation ===
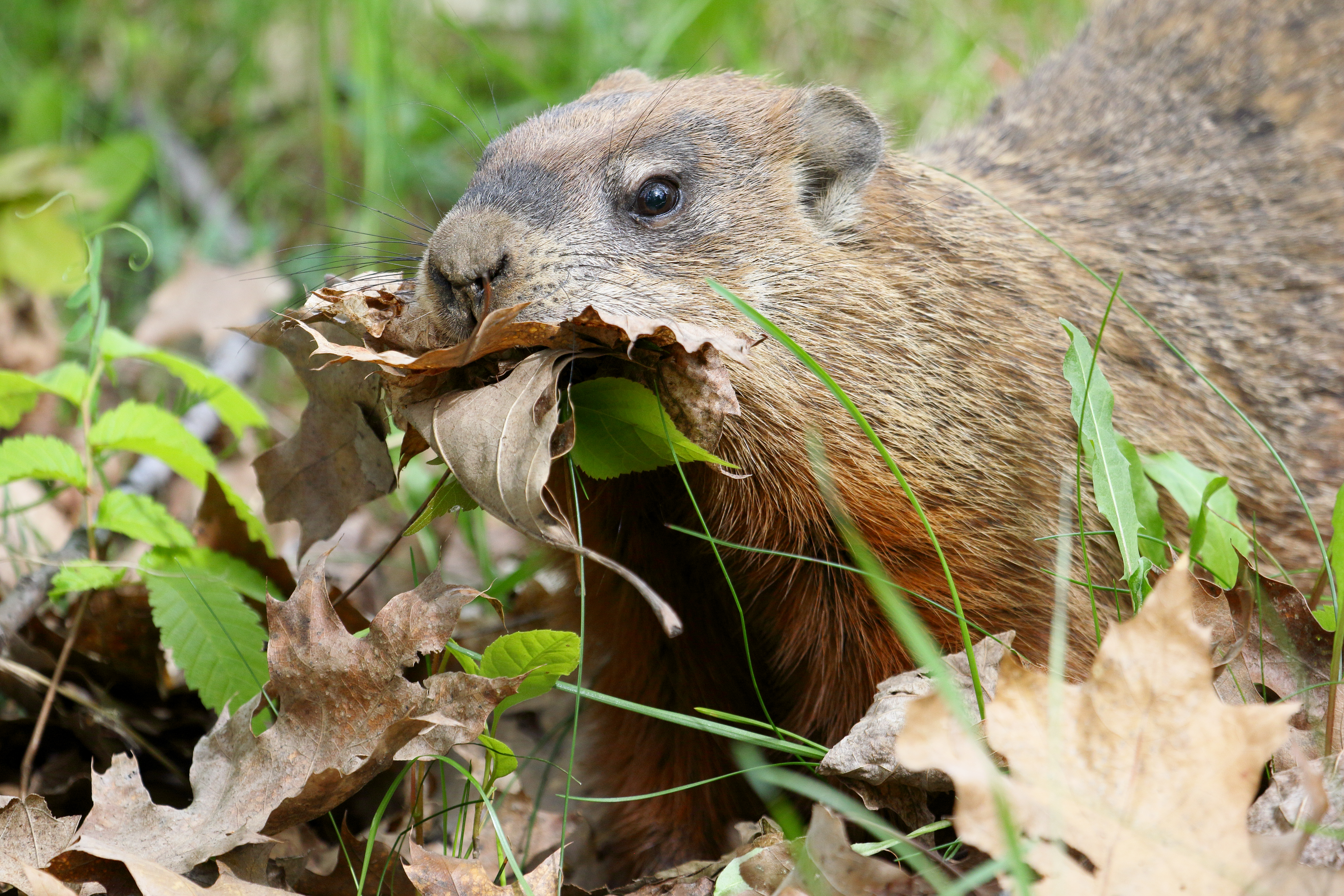
Groundhog gathering nesting material for its warm burrow in preparation for hibernation

Obligate hibernators are animals that spontaneously, and annually, enter hibernation regardless of ambient temperature and access to food. Obligate hibernators include many species of ground squirrels, other rodents, European hedgehogs and other insectivores, monotremes, and marsupials. These species undergo what has been traditionally called "hibernation": a physiological state wherein the body temperature drops to near ambient temperature, and heart and respiration rates slow drastically.

The typical winter season for obligate hibernators is characterized by periods of torpor interrupted by periodic, euthermic arousals, during which body temperatures and heart rates are restored to more typical levels. The cause and purpose of these arousals are still not clear; the question of why hibernators may return periodically to normal body temperatures has plagued researchers for decades, and while there is still no clear-cut explanation, there are multiple hypotheses on the topic. One favored hypothesis is that hibernators build a "sleep debt" during hibernation, and so must occasionally warm up to sleep. This has been supported by evidence in the Arctic ground squirrel. Other theories postulate that brief periods of high body temperature during hibernation allow the animal to restore its available energy sources or to initiate an immune response.

Hibernating Arctic ground squirrels may exhibit abdominal temperatures as low as −2.9 °C (26.8 °F), maintaining sub-zero abdominal temperatures for more than three weeks at a time, although the temperatures at the head and neck remain at 0 °C (32 °F) or above.

=== Facultative hibernation ===
Facultative hibernators enter hibernation only when either cold-stressed, food-deprived, or both, unlike obligate hibernators, who enter hibernation based on seasonal timing cues rather than as a response to stressors from the environment.

A chipmunk, for example, is a facultative hibernator. Even though it sleeps for a long period of time, it is not a true obligate hibernator. This is because during the long period of sleep, its temperatures do not decrease to the low levels of hibernation. It only truly hibernates if food is scarce.

A good example of the differences between these two types of hibernation can be seen in prairie dogs. The white-tailed prairie dog is an obligate hibernator, while the closely related black-tailed prairie dog is a facultative hibernator.

=== Primates ===
While hibernation has long been studied in rodents (namely ground squirrels), no primate or tropical mammal was known to hibernate until the discovery of hibernation in the fat-tailed dwarf lemur of Madagascar, which hibernates in tree holes for seven months of the year. Malagasy winter temperatures sometimes rise to over 30 °C (86 °F), so hibernation is not exclusively an adaptation to low ambient temperatures.

The hibernation of this lemur is strongly dependent on the thermal behaviour of its tree hole: If the hole is poorly insulated, the lemur's body temperature fluctuates widely, passively following the ambient temperature; if well insulated, the body temperature stays fairly constant and the animal undergoes regular spells of arousal. Dausmann found that hypometabolism in hibernating animals is not necessarily coupled with low body temperature.

=== Bears ===
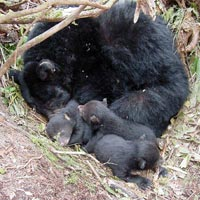
Black bear mother and cubs "denning"

Historically it was unclear whether or not bears truly hibernate, since they experience only a modest decline in body temperature of 3 to 5 °C (5 to 9 °F), compared with the much larger decreases (often 32 °C (60 °F) or more) seen in other hibernators. Many researchers thought that their deep sleep was not comparable with true, deep hibernation, but this theory was refuted by research in 2011 on captive black bears and again in 2016 in a study on brown bears.

Hibernating bears are able to recycle their proteins and urine, allowing them to stop urinating for months and to avoid muscle atrophy. They stay hydrated with the metabolic water that is produced in sufficient quantities to satisfy the water needs of the bear. They also do not eat or drink while hibernating, but live off their stored fat. Despite long-term inactivity and lack of food intake, hibernating bears are believed to maintain their bone mass and do not suffer from osteoporosis. Hibernating bears increase their CART hormone levels which inhibits osteoclasts and they also suppress sclerotin, a protein that stops bone formation to prevent bone loss during prolonged hours of hibernation. Bears can also increase the availability of certain essential amino acids in the muscle by a complex process called urea nitrogen salvage (UNS). In UNS, urea is produced and transported to the gut where microbes break it down into ammonia. This ammonia is then used to synthesize essential amino acids, such as valine and leucine, as well as regulate the transcription of a suite of genes that limit muscle wasting.

A study by G. Edgar Folk, Jill M. Hunt and Mary A. Folk compared EKG of typical hibernators to three different bear species with respect to season, activity and dormancy, and found that the reduced relaxation (QT) interval of small hibernators was the same for the three bear species. They also found the QT interval changed for both typical hibernators and the bears from summer to winter. This 1977 study was one of the first pieces of evidence used to show that bears are hibernators.

In a 2016 study, wildlife veterinarian and associate professor at Inland Norway University of Applied Sciences, Alina L. Evans, researched 14 brown bears over three winters. Their movement, heart rate, heart rate variability, body temperature, physical activity, ambient temperature, and snow depth were measured to identify the drivers of the start and end of hibernation for bears. This study built the first chronology of both ecological and physiological events from before the start to the end of hibernation in the field. This research found that bears would enter their den when snow arrived and ambient temperature dropped to 0 °C (32 °F). However, physical activity, heart rate, and body temperature started to drop slowly even several weeks before this. Once in their dens, the bears' heart rate variability dropped dramatically, indirectly suggesting metabolic suppression is related to their hibernation. Two months before the end of hibernation, the bears' body temperature starts to rise, unrelated to heart rate variability but rather driven by the ambient temperature. The heart rate variability only increases around three weeks before arousal and the bears only leave their den once outside temperatures are at their lower critical temperature. These findings suggest that bears are thermoconforming and bear hibernation is driven by environmental cues, but arousal is driven by physiological cues.

Osteohistological research on the American black bear (Ursus americanus) has shown that skeletal integrity during hibernation is maintained through region-specific microstructural responses, with weight-bearing limb bones retaining dense cortical organization while axial elements exhibit increased internal remodeling, consistent with differential functional demands during prolonged inactivity.

== Birds ==
Ancient people believed that swallows hibernated, and ornithologist Gilbert White documented anecdotal evidence in his 1789 book The Natural History of Selborne that indicated the belief was still current in his time. It is now understood that the vast majority of bird species typically do not hibernate, instead using shorter periods of torpor. One known exception is the common poorwill (Phalaenoptilus nuttallii), for which hibernation was first documented by Edmund Jaeger.

== Dormancy and freezing in ectotherms ==
Because they cannot actively down-regulate their body temperature or metabolic rate, ectothermic animals (including fish, reptiles, and amphibians) cannot engage in obligate or facultative hibernation. They can experience decreased metabolic rates associated with colder environments or low oxygen availability (hypoxia) and exhibit dormancy (known as brumation). It was once thought that basking sharks settled to the floor of the North Sea and became dormant, but research by David Sims in 2003 dispelled this hypothesis, showing that the sharks traveled long distances throughout the seasons, tracking the areas with the highest quantity of plankton. Epaulette sharks have been documented to be able to survive for three hours without oxygen and at temperatures of up to 26 °C (79 °F) as a means to survive in their shoreline habitat, where water and oxygen levels vary with the tide. Other animals able to survive long periods with very little or no oxygen include goldfish, red-eared sliders, wood frogs, and bar-headed geese. The ability to survive hypoxic or anoxic conditions is not closely related to endotherm hibernation.

Some animals can survive winter by freezing. For example, some fish, amphibians, and reptiles can naturally freeze and then "wake" up in the spring. These species have evolved freeze tolerance mechanism such as antifreeze proteins.

== Hibernation induction trigger (HIT) protein and recombinant protein technology ==
Hibernation induction trigger (HIT) proteins isolated from mammals have been used in the study of organ recovery rates. One study in 1997 found that delta 2 opioid and hibernation induction trigger (HIT) proteins were not able to increase the recovery rate of heart tissue during ischemia. While unable to increase recovery rates at the time of ischemia, the protein precursors were identified to play a role in the preservation of veterinary organ function.

Recent advances in recombinant protein technology make it possible for scientists to manufacture hibernation induction trigger (HIT) proteins in the laboratory without the need for animal euthanasia. Bioengineering of proteins can aid in the protection of vulnerable populations of bears and other mammals that produce valuable proteins. Protein sequencing of HIT proteins, such as α 1-glycoprotein-like 88 kDa hibernation-related protein HRP, contributes to this research pool. A study in 2014 uses recombinant technology to construct, express, purify, and isolate animal proteins (HP-20, HP-25, and HP-27) outside of the animal to study key hibernation proteins (HP).

== In humans ==
Researchers have studied how to induce hibernation in humans. The ability to hibernate would be useful for a number of reasons, such as saving the lives of seriously ill or injured people by temporarily putting them in a state of hibernation until treatment can be given. For space travel, human hibernation is also under consideration, such as for missions to Mars.

Anthropologists are also studying whether hibernation was possible in early hominid species.

In 1900 The British Medical Journal described a practice called 'Lotska' among Russian peasants in the Pskov Government, which was said to be closely akin to hibernation. Not having enough food to carry them through the winter, families spent six months sleeping around the stove, waking up once a day to consume some bread and water.

== Evolution of hibernation ==
=== In endothermic animals ===
As the ancestors of birds and mammals colonized land, leaving the relatively stable marine environments, more intense terrestrial seasons began playing a larger role in animals' lives. Some marine animals do go through periods of dormancy, but the effect is stronger and more widespread in terrestrial environments. As hibernation is a seasonal response, the movement of the ancestor of birds and mammals onto land introduced them to seasonal pressures that would eventually become hibernation. This is true for all clades of animals that undergo winter dormancy; the more prominent the seasons are, the longer the dormant period tends to be on average. Hibernation of endothermic animals has likely evolved multiple times, at least once in mammals—though it is debated whether or not it evolved more than once in mammals—and at least once in birds.

In both cases, hibernation likely evolved simultaneously with endothermy, with the earliest suggested instance of hibernation being in Thrinaxodon, an ancestor of mammals that lived roughly 252 million years ago. The evolution of endothermy allowed animals to have greater levels of activity and better incubation of embryos, among other benefits for animals in the Permian and Triassic periods. In order to conserve energy, the ancestors of birds and mammals would likely have experienced an early form of torpor or hibernation when they were not using their thermoregulatory abilities during the transition from ectothermy to endothermy. This is opposed to the previously dominant hypothesis that hibernation evolved after endothermy in response to the emergence of colder habitats. Body size also had an effect on the evolution of hibernation, as endotherms which grow large enough tend to lose their ability to be selectively heterothermic, with bears being one of very few exceptions. After torpor and hibernation diverged from a common proto-hibernating ancestor of birds and mammals, the ability to hibernate or go through torpor would have been lost in most larger mammals and birds. Hibernation would be less favored in larger animals because as animals increase in size, the surface area to volume ratio decreases, and it takes less energy to keep a high internal body temperature, and thus hibernation becomes unnecessary.

There is evidence that hibernation evolved separately in marsupials and placental mammals, though it is not settled. That evidence stems from development, where as soon as young marsupials from hibernating species are able to regulate their own heat, they have the capability to hibernate. In contrast, placental mammals that hibernate first develop homeothermy, only developing the ability to hibernate at a later point. This difference in development is evidence, though inconclusive, that they evolved by slightly different mechanisms and thus at different times.

=== Brumation in reptiles ===
As reptiles are ectothermic, having no system to deal with cold temperatures would be deadly in many environments. Reptilian winter dormancy, or brumation, likely evolved to help reptiles survive colder conditions. Reptiles that are dormant in the winter tend to have higher survival rates and slower aging. Reptiles evolved to exploit their ectothermy to deliberately cool their internal body temperatures. As opposed to mammals or birds, which will prepare for their hibernation but not directly cause it through their behavior, reptiles will trigger their own hibernation through their behavior. Reptiles seek out colder temperatures based on a periodic internal clock, which is likely triggered by cooler outside temperatures, as shown in the Texas horned lizard (Phrynosoma cornutum). One mechanism that reptiles use to survive hibernation, hypercapnic acidosis (the buildup of carbon dioxide in the blood), is also present in mammal hibernation. This is likely an example of convergent evolution. Hypercapnic acidosis evolved as a mechanism to slow metabolism and also interfere with oxygen transport so that oxygen is not used up and can still reach tissues in low oxygen periods of dormancy.

=== Diapause in arthropods ===
Seasonal diapause, or arthropod winter dormancy, seems to be plastic and quickly evolving, with large genetic variation and strong effects of natural selection present as well as having evolved many times across many clades of arthropods. As such, there is very little phylogenetic conservation in the genetic mechanism for diapause. Particularly the timing and extent of the seasonal diapause seem particularly variable, currently evolving as a response to climate change. As typical with hibernation, it evolved after the increased influence of seasonality as arthropods colonized terrestrial environments as a mechanism to keep energy costs low, particularly in harsher than normal environments, as well as being a good way to time the active or reproductive periods in arthropods. It is thought to have originally evolved in three stages. The first is development of neuroendocrine control over bodily functions, the second is pairing of that to environmental changes—in this case metabolic rates decreasing in response to colder temperatures—and the third is the pairing of these controls with reliable seasonal indicators within the arthropod, like biological timers. From these steps, arthropods developed a seasonal diapause, where many of their biological functions end up paired with a seasonal rhythm within the organism. This is a very similar mechanism to the evolution of insect migration, where instead of bodily functions like metabolism getting paired with seasonal indicators, movement patterns would be paired with seasonal indicators.

=== Winter dormancy in fish ===
While most animals that go through winter dormancy lower their metabolic rates, some fish, such as the cunner, do not. Instead, they do not actively depress their base metabolic rate, but instead they simply reduce their activity level. Fish that undergo winter dormancy in oxygenated water survive via inactivity paired with the colder temperature, which decreases energy consumption, but not the base metabolic rate that their bodies consume. But the Antarctic yellowbelly rockcod (Notothenia coriiceps), as well as fish that undergo winter dormancy in hypoxic conditions, do suppress their metabolism like other animals that are dormant in the winter. The mechanism for evolution of metabolic suppression in fish is unknown. Most fish that are dormant in the winters save enough energy by being still and so there is not a strong selective pressure to develop a metabolic suppression mechanism like that which is necessary in hypoxic conditions.

== See also ==
- Cryobiology – Study of effects of extreme low temperatures on life
- Dormancy – State of minimized physical activity of an organism
- Karolina Olsson – Swedish hibernator (1861–1950)
- Torpor – State of decreased physiological activity in an animal
- Winter cluster – Cluster of honey bees in cold temperatures
- Winter rest – Annual state for some plants and animals
