= Winter cluster =

Cluster of honey bees in cold temperatures

In beekeeping, a winter cluster is a well-defined cluster of honey bees that forms inside a beehive when the air temperature dips below 10 to 14 °C (50 to 57 °F). Honey bees are one of only a few kinds of insects that survive the winter as a colony. As the outside air temperature decreases the winter cluster becomes tighter and more compact. The bees cling tightly together on the combs in the hive. The temperature within the winter cluster remains remarkably warm regardless of the outside air temperature. Larger clusters (basketball size) have a better chance for survival than smaller clusters (softball size). The winter cluster within the hive must move throughout the winter to reach the available honey stored in the combs.

Some die-off is expected during the winter. In extended cold weather periods, the incidence of Nosema disease increases and the cluster may weaken as many bees begin dying off.

== Honey bee brood nest ==
In subtropical climates, bees may not form a winter cluster at all. Worker bees forage and queens lay eggs almost year-round.

In the temperate zones, winter temperatures dip below 12 °C (54 °F) for extended periods. All brood rearing stops for some period during the winter. In early spring, brood rearing resumes inside the winter cluster when the queen starts to lay eggs again. Once a brood nest is established, the cluster must maintain a steady temperature between 34.5 and 36.7 °C (94.1 and 98.1 °F) inside the cluster. If the temperature in areas of the brood nest dips too low the brood could die – also called chilled brood.

== See also ==
- Hibernation
