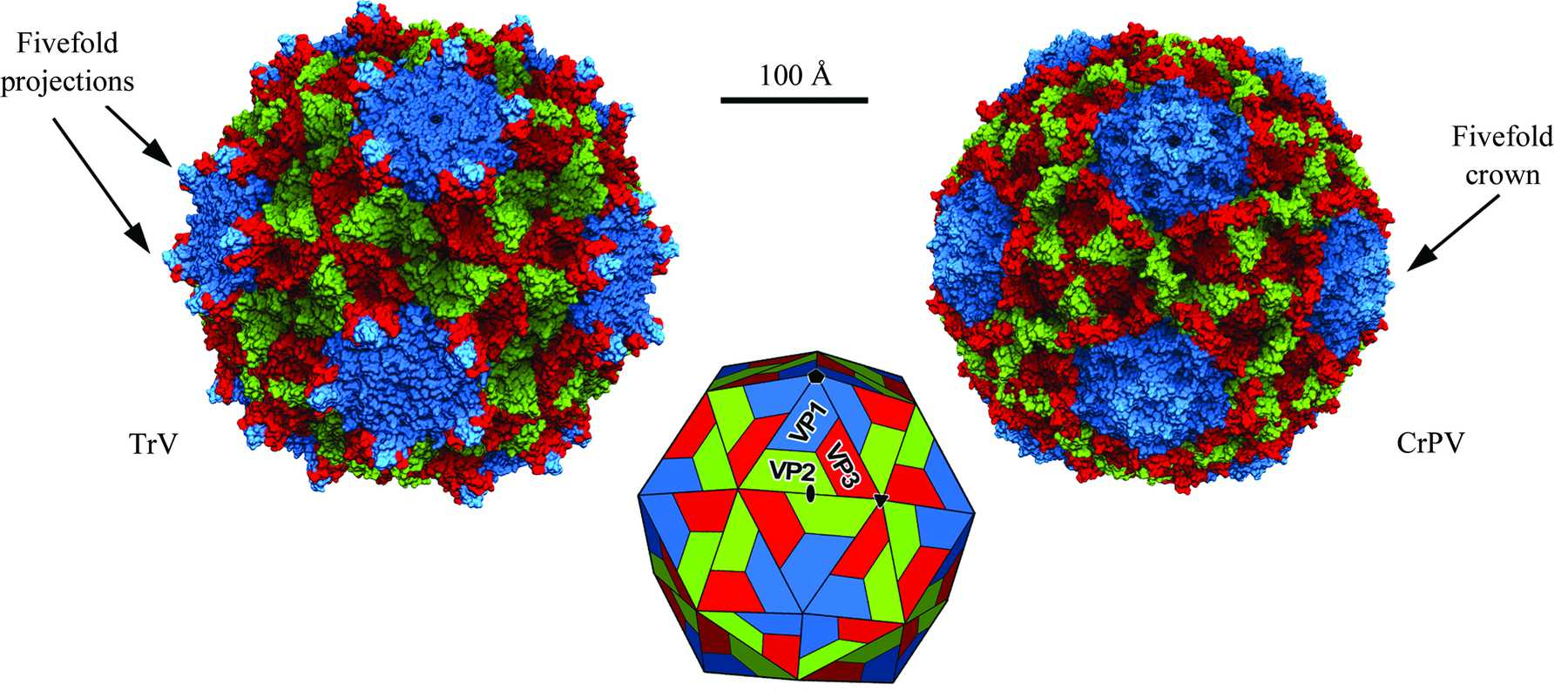
- Molecular surfaces of Triatoma virus (TrV) and Cricket paralysis virus (CrPV)

Virus classification
- (unranked): Virus
- Realm: Riboviria
- Kingdom: Orthornavirae
- Phylum: Pisuviricota
- Class: Pisoniviricetes
- Order: Picornavirales
- Family: Dicistroviridae

Genera
- Aparavirus; Cripavirus; Triatovirus

= Dicistroviridae =

Family of viruses

Dicistroviridae is a family of viruses in the order Picornavirales. Invertebrates, including aphids, leafhoppers, flies, bees, ants, and silkworms, serve as natural hosts. There are 16 species in this family, assigned to three genera. Diseases associated with this family include: DCV: increased reproductive potential. extremely pathogenic when injected with high associated mortality. CrPV: paralysis and death.

== Taxonomy ==
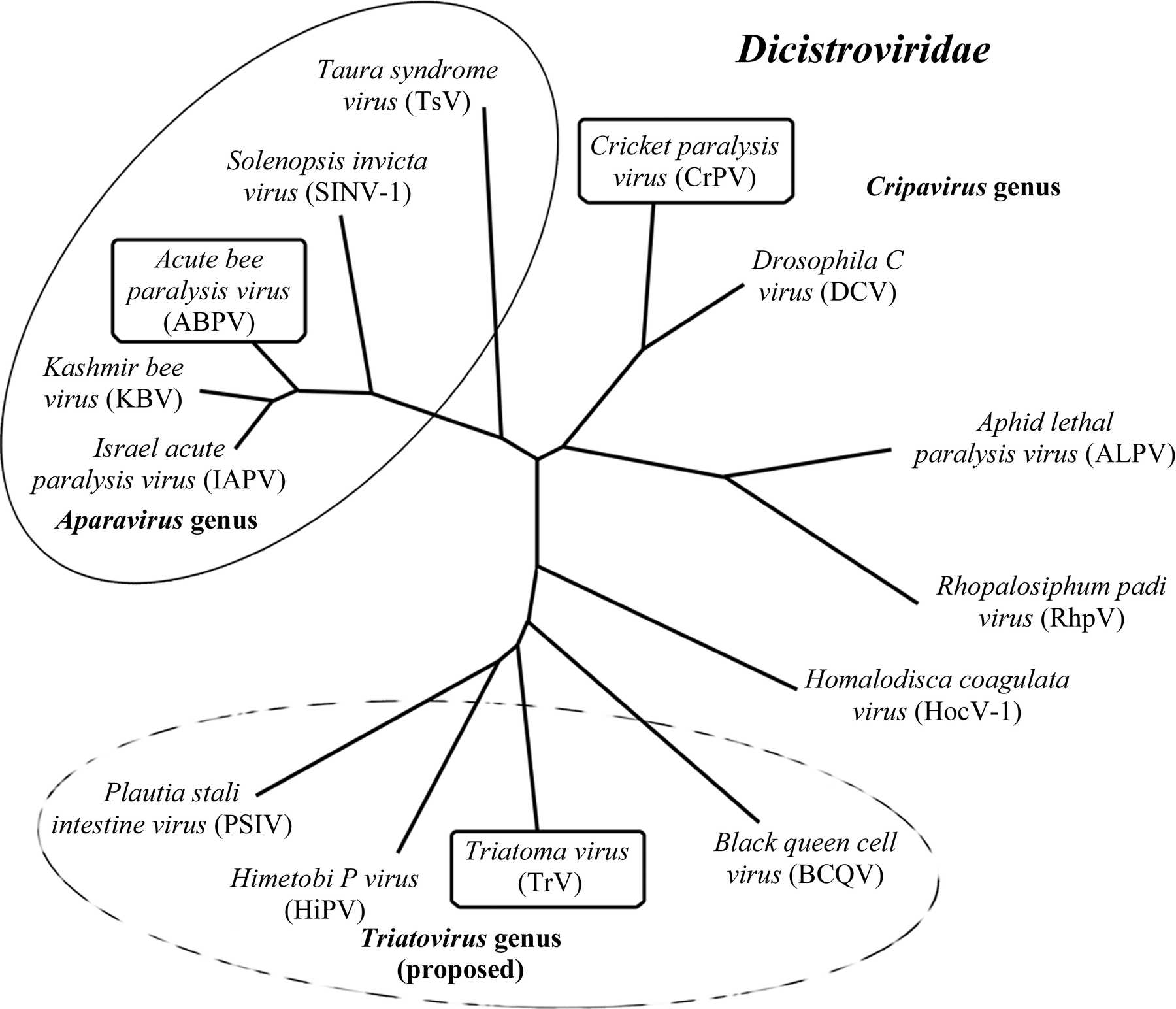
Phylogenetic tree of Dicistroviridae

Although many dicistroviruses were initially placed in the Picornaviridae, they have since been reclassified into their own family. The name (Dicistro) is derived from the characteristic dicistronic arrangement of the genome.

This family is a member of the Order Picornavirales (along with the families Iflaviridae, Picornaviridae, and Secoviridae and Marnaviridae). Within this order, the gene order is the gene order of the nonstructural proteins Hel(helicase)-Pro(protease)-RdRp(polymerase). The Dicistroviridae can be distinguished from the members of the taxa by the location of their structural protein genes at the 3' end rather than the 5' end (as found in Iflavirus, Picornaviridae and Secoviridae) and by having two genomic segments rather than a single one (as in the Comovirus).

The family contains the following genera and species:

Genus: Aparavirus

- Aparavirus apisacutum, Acute bee paralysis virus
- Aparavirus cancerluti, Mud crab virus
- Aparavirus israelense, Israeli acute paralysis virus
- Aparavirus kashmirense, Kashmir bee virus
- Aparavirus tauraense, Taura syndrome virus
- Aparavirus vallesi, Solenopsis invicta virus 1

Genus: Cripavirus

- Cripavirus drosophilae, Drosophila C virus
- Cripavirus grylli, Cricket paralysis virus
- Cripavirus mortiferum, Aphid lethal paralysis virus
- Cripavirus porteri, Solenopsis invicta virus 6
- Cripavirus ropadi, Rhopalosiphum padi virus

Genus: Triatovirus

- Triatovirus himetobi, Himetobi P virus
- Triatovirus hocoagulatae, Homalodisca coagulata virus-1
- Triatovirus nigereginacellulae, Black queen cell virus
- Triatovirus plastali, Plautia stali intestine virus
- Triatovirus triatomae, Triatoma virus

Linepithema humile virus 1 is possibly a member of Dicistroviridae, of unclear placement.

== Structure ==
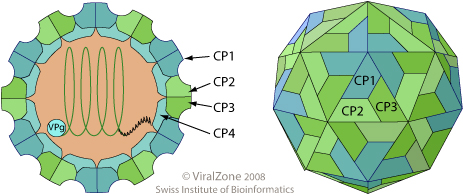
Schematic drawings of Dicistroviridae virions

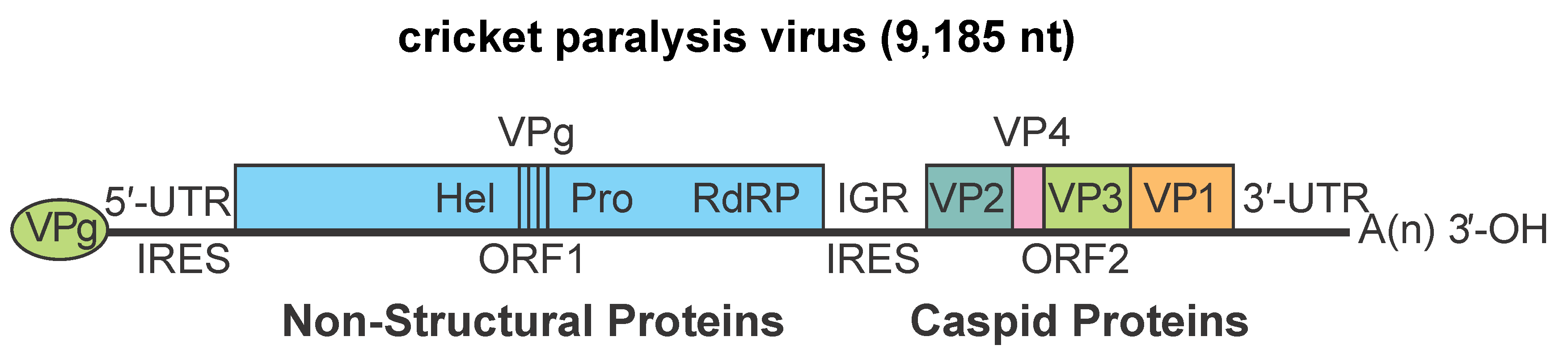
Genome of cricket paralysis virus (CrPV) from family Dicistroviridea

Viruses in Dicistroviridae are non-enveloped, with icosahedral geometries, and T=pseudo3 symmetry. The diameter is around 30 nm. Genomes are linear and non-segmented, around 8.5-10.2kb in length. The genome has 2 open reading frames.

Genus	Structure	Symmetry	Capsid	Genomic arrangement	Genomic segmentation
Aparavirus	Icosahedral	Pseudo T=3	Non-enveloped	Linear	
Cripavirus	Icosahedral	Pseudo T=3	Non-enveloped	Linear	Monopartite

== Life cycle ==
Entry into the host cell is achieved by penetration into the host cell. Replication follows the positive stranded RNA virus replication model. Positive stranded RNA virus transcription is the method of transcription. Translation takes place by viral initiation, and ribosomal skipping. Invertebrates serve as the natural host. Transmission routes are contamination.

Genus	Host details	Tissue tropism	Entry details	Release details	Replication site	Assembly site	Transmission
Aparavirus	Invertebrates: honeybee, bumblebees	None	Unknown	Unknown	Cytoplasm	Cytoplasm	Unknown
Cripavirus	Invertebrates	None	Cell receptor endocytosis	Budding	Cytoplasm	Cytoplasm	Food

== RNA structural elements ==
Many of the Dicistroviridae genomes contains structured RNA elements. For example, the Cripaviruses have an internal ribosome entry site, which mimics a Met-tRNA and is used in the initiation of translation.
