= Aparavirus =

Virus classification
- (unranked): Virus
- Realm: Riboviria
- Kingdom: Orthornavirae
- Phylum: Pisuviricota
- Class: Pisoniviricetes
- Order: Picornavirales
- Family: Dicistroviridae
- Genus: Aparavirus

Genus of viruses

Aparavirus is a genus of viruses in the order Picornavirales, in the family Dicistroviridae. Invertebrates, honeybee, and bumblebees serve as natural hosts. There are six species in this genus. Diseases associated with this genus include: ABPV: paralysis. This virus plays a role in sudden collapse of honey bee colonies infested with the parasitic mite varroa destructor.

== Taxonomy ==
The genus contains the following species, listed by scientific name and followed by the exemplar virus of the species:

- Aparavirus apisacutum, Acute bee paralysis virus
- Aparavirus cancerluti, Mud crab virus
- Aparavirus israelense, Israeli acute paralysis virus
- Aparavirus kashmirense, Kashmir bee virus
- Aparavirus tauraense, Taura syndrome virus
- Aparavirus vallesi, Solenopsis invicta virus 1

== Structure ==
Viruses in Aparavirus are non-enveloped, with icosahedral geometries, and T=pseudo3 symmetry. The diameter is around 30 nm. Genomes are linear and non-segmented. The genome has 2 open reading frames.

| Genus | Structure | Symmetry | Capsid | Genomic arrangement | Genomic segmentation |
|---|---|---|---|---|---|
| Aparavirus | Icosahedral | Pseudo T=3 | Non-enveloped | Linear | |

== Life cycle ==
Entry into the host cell is achieved by penetration into the host cell. Replication follows the positive stranded RNA virus replication model. Positive stranded RNA virus transcription is the method of transcription. Invertebrates, honeybee, and bumblebees serve as the natural host. Transmission routes are contamination and saliva.

| Genus | Host details | Tissue tropism | Entry details | Release details | Replication site | Assembly site | Transmission |
|---|---|---|---|---|---|---|---|
| Aparavirus | Invertebrates: honeybee, bumblebees | None | Unknown | Unknown | Cytoplasm | Cytoplasm | Unknown |
