= Taura syndrome =

Taura syndrome virus

Virus classification
- (unranked): Virus
- Realm: Riboviria
- Kingdom: Orthornavirae
- Phylum: Pisuviricota
- Class: Pisoniviricetes
- Order: Picornavirales
- Family: Dicistroviridae
- Genus: Aparavirus
- Species: Aparavirus tauraense

Virus affecting shrimp

Taura syndrome (TS) is one of the more devastating diseases affecting the shrimp farming industry worldwide. It was first described in Ecuador during the summer of 1992. In March 1993, it returned as a major epidemic and was the object of extensive media coverage. Retrospective studies have suggested a case of Taura syndrome might have occurred on a shrimp farm in Colombia as early as 1990 and the virus was already present in Ecuador in mid-1991. Between 1992 and 1997, the disease spread to all major regions of the Americas where whiteleg shrimp (Litopenaeus vannamei) is cultured. The economic impact of TS in the Americas during that period might have exceeded US$2 billion by some estimates.

== Overview ==
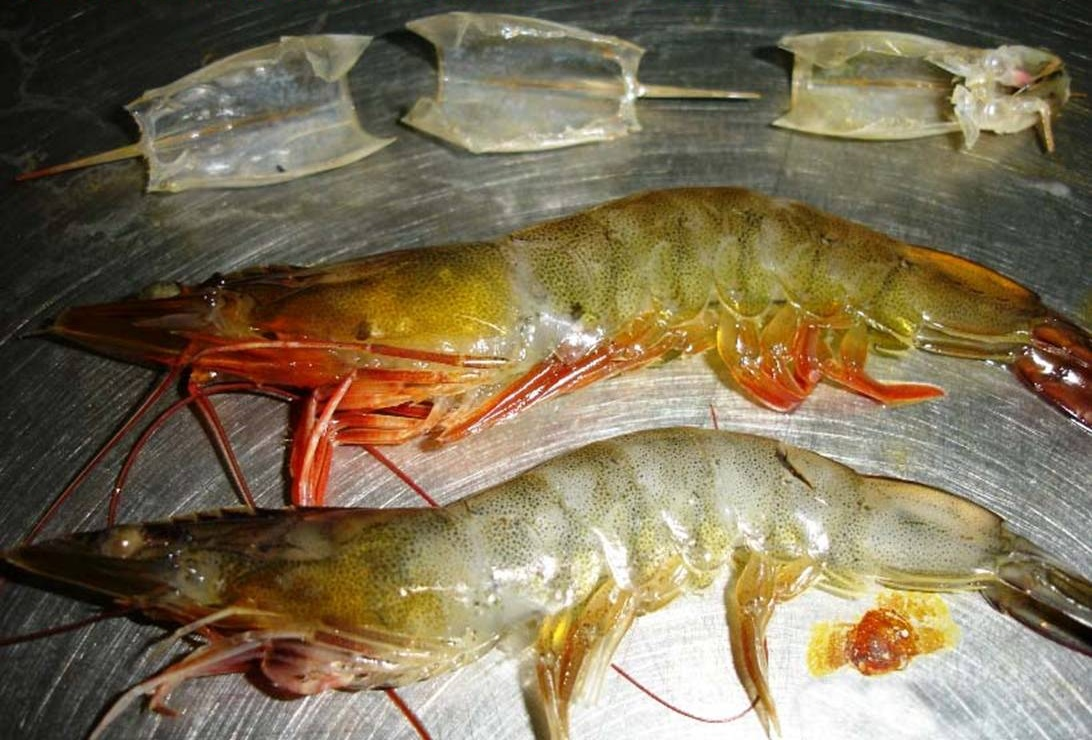
Healthy Litopenaeus vannamei (above); L. vannamei infected with Taura syndrome virus (below)

The 1992 Ecuadorian TS epidemic occurred concurrently with an outbreak of black leaf wilt disease in banana plantations. The outbreak of black leaf disease led to an increase in fungicide usage within the Taura River basin district near the city of Guayaquil. The fungicides propiconazole (Tilt, Ciba-Geigy) and tridemorph (Calixin, BASF) used to control black leaf, ran off into nearby ponds and were initially thought to be responsible for the disease. Analytical data demonstrated propiconazole in water, sediments and hepatopancreas tissues of shrimp harvested from affected farms in Ecuador. No other pesticides were discovered.

In January 1994, at the request of Ciba-Geigy, a workshop on Taura syndrome was held at the Aquaculture Pathology Laboratory of the University of Arizona. Experts from several countries with expertise in shrimp and insect pathology, shrimp nutrition, toxicology, mycology, water quality and farm management participated in the workshop. Industry representatives also participated. The group developed recommendations as to the standardization of the research on TS and suggested that studies be done to evaluate whether fungicides or as-yet unrecognized agents were responsible for the syndrome.

Dr. Jim Brock, the aquatic disease specialist for the State of Hawaii during this period, first demonstrated the disease could be transmitted by feeding Taura victims to healthy shrimp in early 1994. The dying test shrimp were then fed to a new set of shrimp, which was dying at the same rate. Rivers' postulates were fulfilled in 1994 by Dr. Ken Hasson and co-researchers at the University of Arizona. This proved the viral etiology of the syndrome. The virus was named Taura syndrome virus, often referred to as TSV. The virus is referred to by the name infectious cuticular epithelial necrosis virus (ICENV) by some authors in Latin America. Taura syndrome is a notifiable disease by the Office international des Épizooties (OIE), which reflects the serious nature and devastating impact of the disease.

== Identification and description of the virus ==
Taura syndrome virus was first classified as a possible member of the family Picornaviridae based on biological and physical characteristics. It was later reclassified in the Dicistroviridae family, genus Cripavirus. It has since been reassigned to a second genus in the same family – the Aparavirus.

TSV is a 32 nm nonenveloped particle with an icosahedral morphology and a buoyant density of 1.338 g/ml. The genome is single-stranded positive-sense and has 10,205 nucleotides (excluding the 3' poly-A tail). The capsid consists of three major proteins: CP1 (40 kDa), CP2 (55 kDa) and CP3 (24 kDa) alongside a minor protein of 58 kDa.

Audelo-del-Valle in 2003 reported certain primate cell lines could be used to culture TSV. Later studies demonstrated their report was based on misinterpreted data. TSV does not appear to be a potential zoonosis. All virus amplifications require the use of live shrimp, as there is no continuous cell line that supports the growth of shrimp viruses.

== Variants of the virus ==
RNA viruses such as TSV have high rates of spontaneous mutation. These very high rates might be due to the lack of proofreading function of the RNA-dependent RNA polymerase and have resulted in the emergence of several genetic variants of the virus. As of May 2009, four genetic clusters are recognized: Belize (TSV-BZ), America (TSV-HI), Southeast Asia and Venezuela. The Belize strain is considered the most virulent. Point mutations in TSV capsid proteins might provide specific isolates with selective advantages such as host adaptability, increased virulence or increased replication ability. Even small variations in the TSV genome can result in substantial differences in virulence.

All TSV variants are similar in shape and size, with light variations. The average size of TSV-BZ virus particles is 32.693+/- 1.834 nm compared to TSV-HI with a size of 31.485 +/- 1.187 nm. The region of highest genetic difference is within the capsid protein CP2, with pairwise comparison of nucleotide showing a 0 to 3.5% difference amongst isolates. The most variations in CP2 occur at the 3'-terminal sequence; this may be because it is less constrained by structural requirements and more exposed than other regions of the protein.

== Geographic distribution ==
TSV has been reported from virtually all shrimp-growing regions of the Americas, including Ecuador, Colombia, Peru, Brazil, El Salvador, Guatemala, Honduras, Belize, Mexico, Nicaragua, Panama, Costa Rica, and Venezuela, as well as from the states of Hawaii, Texas, Florida and South Carolina. Until 1998, it was considered to be a Western Hemisphere virus. The first Asian outbreak occurred in Taiwan. It has more recently been identified in Thailand, Myanmar, China, Korea, and Indonesia, where it has been associated with severe epizootics in farmed Penaeus vannamei and Penaeus monodon.

The wide distribution of the disease has been attributed to the movement of infected host stocks for aquaculture purposes. This might have been helped by the highly stable nature of the virus. Importation of TSV-infected P. vannamei from the Western Hemisphere is thought to have been the origin of the outbreak in Taiwan. This was further suggested by the genomic similarity of the Taiwan and Western Hemisphere isolates. TSV appeared in Thailand in 2003. Due to the similarities in deduced CP2 amino acids sequence and the chronology of the disease outbreaks in relation to imported stocks, at least some of the Thai isolates likely originated from Chinese stocks.

Taura syndrome can spread rapidly when introduced in new areas. A shrimp farmer described the 1995 outbreak in Texas as, "This thing spread like a forest fire... There was no stopping it. I just sat there and watched it and in a matter of three days, my shrimp were gone. Dead!"

== Species of susceptible shrimp ==
TSV is known to affect many shrimp species. It causes serious diseases in the postlarval, juvenile and adult stages of Penaeus vannamei. It also affects severely P. setiferus, P. stylirostris, P. schmitti, and Metapenaeus ensis. P. chinensis is highly susceptible to the disease in experimental bioassays.

Variation occurs within species, and TSV-resistant strains of shrimp have been developed. Wild stocks are showing increased resistance, perhaps through intense natural selection. Reports of TS in the wild are limited, but in February 1995, the Mexican Fisheries Ministry reported the presence of TSV in wild-type shrimp captured on the border of Mexico and Guatemala. As of 2007, no confirmed reports indicated TSV is infectious to other groups of decapod or nondecapod crustaceans.

== Pathology and disease cycle ==
In farm situations, TS often causes high mortality during the first 15 to 40 days of stocking into shrimp ponds. The course of infection may be acute (5–20 days) to chronic (more than 120 days) at the pond and farm level. The disease has three distinct phases that sometimes overlap: acute, transition and chronic. The disease cycle has been characterized in detail in P. vannamei.

After the initial infection, the acute phase develops. Clinical signs can occur as early as 7 hours after infection in some individuals and last for about 4–7 days. Infected shrimp display anorexia, lethargy and erratic swimming behavior. They also present opacification of the tail musculature, soft cuticle and, in naturally occurring infection, a red tail due to the expansion of the red chromatophores. Mortality during this phase can be as high as 95%. The acute phase is characterized histologically by multifocal areas of nuclear pyknosis/karyorrhexis and numerous cytoplasmic inclusion bodies in the cuticular epithelium and the subcutis of the general body surface, all appendages, gills, hindgut, esophagus and stomach. The pyknosis and karyorrhexis give a "buckshot" appearance to the tissue and are considered pathognomonic for the disease. In severe infections the antennal gland tubule epithelium, the hematopoietic tissues and the testis are also affected. This occurs mainly in severe infection following injection of viral particles and has not been reported from naturally infected P. vannamei. Shrimp that survive the acute stage enter a transitional stage.

Shrimp in the transitional phase show randomly distributed, melanized (brownish/black) lesions within of the cuticle of the cephalothorax and tail region. These foci are the sites of acute lesions which have progressed onto subsequent stages of hemocytic inflammation, cuticular epithelium regeneration and healing and which might be secondarily infected with bacteria. These foci are negative for TSV by in situ hybridization (ISH) using a TSV-specific cDNA probe. Histologically, these shrimp present focal active acute lesions and the onset of lymphoid organ spheroids (LOSs) development. By ISH with TSV-specific probes, a diffuse positive signal can be observed within the walls of the lymphoid organ of normal appearance with or without focal probe signals within developing LOSs. These shrimp will be lethargic and anorexic, possibly because of the redirection of their energy and metabolic resources toward wound repair and recovery. If the shrimp undergo another successful moult following the transitional phase, they will cast off the melanized lesions and enter the chronic phase.

The chronic phase is first seen six days after infection and persist for at least 12 months under experimental conditions. This phase is characterized histologically by the absence of acute lesions and the presence of LOS of successive morphologies. These LOSs are positive by ISH for TSV. A low prevalence of ectopic spheroids can also be observed in some cases. LOSs are not by themselves characteristic of TSV infection and can be found in other viral diseases of shrimp such as lymphoid organ vacuolization virus (LOVV), lymphoid parvo-like virus (LPV), lymphoid organ virus (LOV), rhabdovirus of penaeid shrimp (RPS) and yellowhead virus (YHV). Diagnosis of the disease during the chronic phase is problematic, as shrimp do not display any outward signs of the disease and do not show mortality from the infection. Survivors may become carriers for life. Shrimp with chronic TSV infection are not as vigorous as uninfected shrimp, as demonstrated by their inability to tolerate a salinity drop as well as uninfected shrimp. A 2011 study by Laxminath Tumburu looked at the relationship between an environmental stressor (pesticide endosulfan) and Taura syndrome virus (TSV) and their interactions on the susceptibility and molting of marine penaeid shrimp L. vannamei and found the interference of endosulfan-associated stress led to increasingly higher susceptibility at postmolt stage during the acute phase of the TSV disease cycle.

== Routes of transmission ==
The most likely route for transmission of TSV is cannibalism of dead infected shrimp. The virus can be spread from one farm to another by seagulls and aquatic insects. Infectious TSV has been found in the feces of laughing gulls that fed on infected shrimp during an epizootic in Texas. Controlled laboratory studies have documented that TSV remains infectious for up to one day after passage through the gut of white leghorns chicken (Gallus domesticus) and laughing gulls. Although vertical transmission is suspected this has not been experimentally confirmed.

Shrimp surviving a TSV infection are lifelong carriers of the virus and are a significant source of virus for susceptible animals. It has been hypothesized that TSV was introduced to Southeast Asia with chronically infected shrimp imported from the Western Hemisphere. The ability of TSV to remain at least partly infectious after one or several freeze-thaw cycles might be a contributing factor facilitating its spread in the international commerce of frozen commodity products. Mechanisms by which infected frozen shrimp could spread the virus include: reprocessing of shrimp at processing plants with release of infectious liquid wastes, disposal of solid wastes in landfills where seagulls could acquire the virus and then spread it, the use of shrimp as bait by sport fishermen and the use of imported shrimp as fresh food for other aquatic species.

== Diagnostic methods ==
A presumptive diagnosis of acute TSV infection can be established by the presence of dead or dying shrimp in cast nets used for routine evaluation. Predatory birds are attracted to diseased ponds and feed heavily on the dying shrimp. The unique signs of infection caused by TS, such as the cuticular melanized spots, can provide a strong presumptive diagnosis, but care must be taken as these can be confused with other diseases, such as bacterial shell disease. (Note: Bacterial shell disease was first described in Penaeus and Callinectes sapidus by Cook and Lofton (1973).) In general pathognomonic histopathological lesions are the first step in confirmatory diagnosis. Discrete foci of pyknotic and karyorhectic nuclei and inflammation are seen within the cuticular tissues. The lymphoid organ might display spheroids, but is otherwise unremarkable.

The genome of the virus has been cloned and cDNA probes are available for diagnosis. Reverse transcriptase polymerase chain reaction (RT-PCR) methods have been developed for detection of TSV and are very sensitive. Real-time techniques allow for quantification of the virus. The IQ2000TM TSV detection system, a RT-PCR method, is said to have a detection limit of 10 copies per reaction.

RNA-based methods are limited by the relative fragility of the viral RNA. Prolonged fixation in Davidsons' fixative might result in RNA degradation due to fixative-induced acid hydrolysis. An alternative for virus detection is the use of specific monoclonal antibodies (MAbs) directed against the relatively stable proteins in the viral capsid. Rapid diagnostic tests using MAbs are now in common use for white spot syndrome virus and are being marketed under the commercial name of Shrimple. Similar tests for TSV, yellowhead virus and infectious hypodermal and haematopoietic necrosis virus are currently under development.

== Methods of control ==
Management strategies for the disease have included raising more resistant species such as the Western blue shrimp (Penaeus stylirostris) and stocking of specific pathogen free (SPF) or specific pathogen resistant (SPR) shrimp. Relatively simple laboratory challenges can be used to predict the performance of selected stocks in farms where TSV is enzootic. The resistant shrimp lines currently raised have reached nearly complete resistance to some TSV variants and further improvement due to breeding for TSV-resistance is expected be minor for these variants. Significant improvements in TSV survival were made through selective breeding despite low to moderate heritability for this trait.

A management strategy used to reduce the impact of TS has been the practice of stocking postlarval shrimp at increased stocking density. Following this strategy, farms would experience mortality due to TS at an early stage of the production cycle, before substantial feeding had begun and the surviving shrimp would be resistant to further TSV challenges. Other techniques used with limited efficacy have been the polyculture of shrimp with tilapia and maintenance of near-optimal water quality conditions in the grow-out ponds with reduction of organic loading. Transgenic shrimp expressing an antisense TSV coat protein (TSV-CP) exhibited increased survival in TSV challenges. The public perception of transgenic animals, as well as current technical limitations, limit the use of transgenic animals as a mean of disease control.
