= List of diseases of the honey bee =

Diseases of the honey bee or abnormal hive conditions include:

== Pests and parasites ==
=== Varroa mites ===
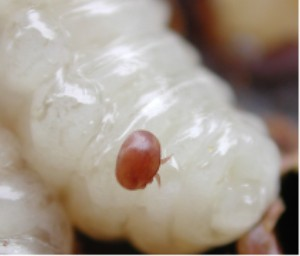
Varroa mite on a honey bee larva

Varroa destructor and V. jacobsoni are parasitic mites that feed on the fat bodies of adult, pupal and larval bees. When the hive is very heavily infested, Varroa mites can be seen with the naked eye as a small red or brown spot on the bee's thorax. Varroa mites are carriers for many viruses that are damaging to bees. For example, bees infected during their development will often have visibly deformed wings.

Varroa mites have led to the virtual elimination of feral bee colonies in many areas, and are a major problem for kept bees in apiaries. Some feral populations are now recovering—it appears they have been naturally selected for Varroa resistance.

Varroa mites were first discovered in Southeast Asia in about 1904, but are now present on all continents, following their introduction to Australia in 2022. They were discovered in the United States in 1987, in the United Kingdom in 1992, and in New Zealand in 2000.

To the untrained eye, these mites are generally not a very noticeable problem for a strongly growing hive- as the bees may appear strong in number, and may even be very effective at foraging. However, the mite reproduction cycle occurs inside the capped pupae, and the mite population can surge as a result of colony growth. Careful observation of a colony can help identify signs of disease often spread by mites. When the hive population growth is reduced in preparation for winter or due to poor late summer forage, the mite population growth can overtake that of the bees and can then destroy the hive. It has been observed diseased colonies may slowly die off and be unable to survive through winter even when adequate food stores are present. Often a colony will simply abscond (leave as in a swarm, but leaving no population behind) under such conditions.

Varroa in combination with viral vectors and bacteria have been theoretically implicated in colony collapse disorder.

It is known that thymol, a compound produced by thyme, naturally occurring in thyme honey, is a treatment for Varroa, though it may cause bee mortality at high concentrations. Provisioning active colonies with crops of thyme may provide the colony with a non-interventional chemical defense against Varroa.

==== Treatment ====
A variety of chemical and mechanical treatments are used to attempt to control Varroa mites.

"Hard" chemicals

"Hard" chemical treatments include amitraz (marketed as "Apivar"), fluvalinate (marketed as "Apistan"), coumaphos (marketed as CheckMite), flumethrin (marketed as "Bayvarol" and "Polyvar Yellow").

"Soft" chemicals

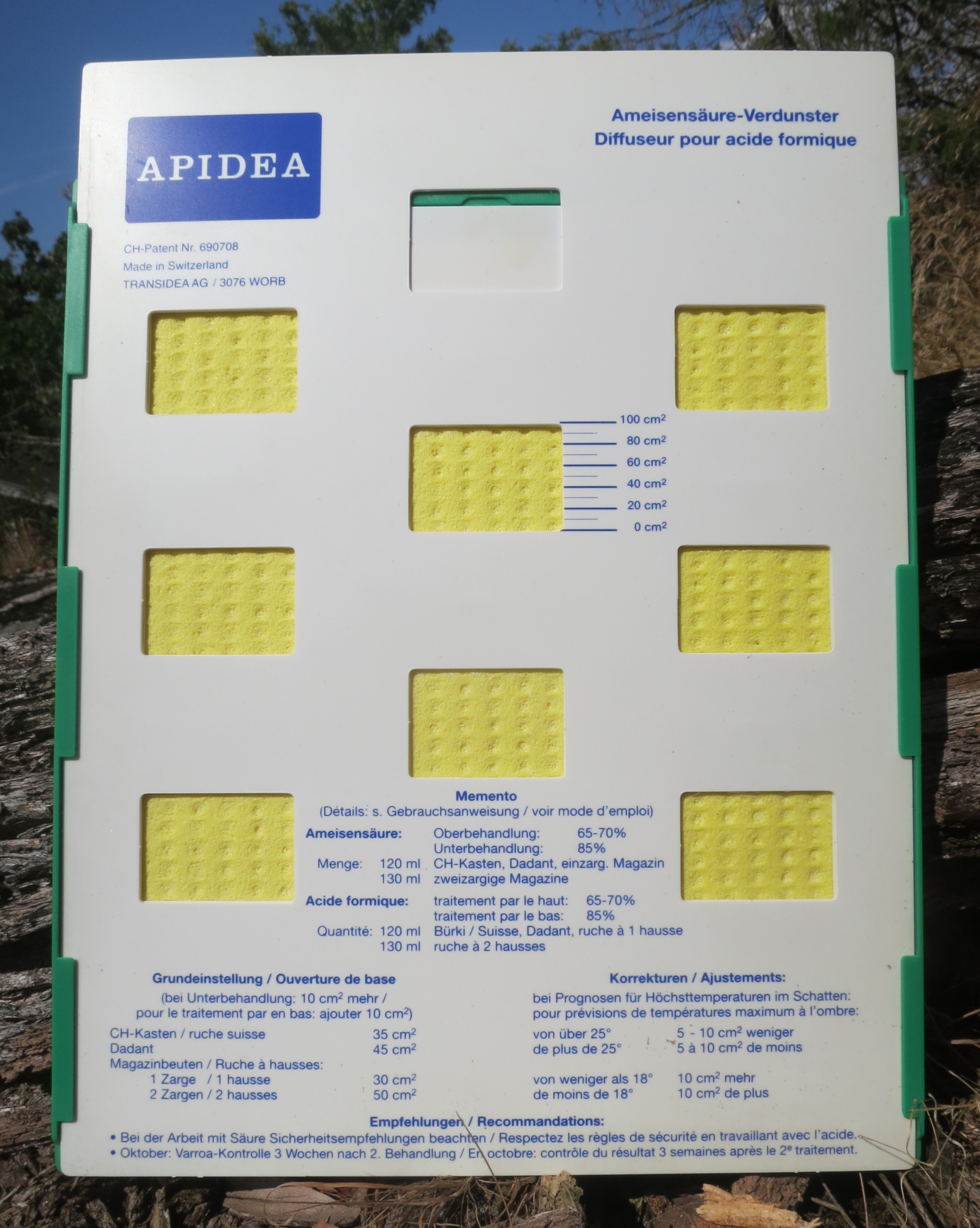
Formic acid evaporator for mite control in beehives.

"Soft" chemical treatments include thymol (marketed as "ApiLife-VAR" and "Apiguard"), sucrose octanoate esters (marketed as "Sucrocide"), oxalic acid (marked as "Api-bioxal") and formic acid (sold in liquid form or in gel strips as Mite Away Quick Strips and Formic Pro, but also used in other formulations).

According to the U.S. Environmental Protection Agency, when used in beehives as directed, chemical treatments kill a large proportion of the mites while not substantially disrupting bee behavior or life span. Use of chemical controls is generally regulated and varies from country to country. With few exceptions, they are not intended for use during production of marketable honey.

"Mechanical" treatments

Common mechanical controls generally rely on disruption of some aspect of the mites' lifecycle. These controls are generally intended not to eliminate all mites, but merely to maintain the infestation at a level which the colony can tolerate. Examples of mechanical controls include drone brood sacrifice (Varroa mites are preferentially attracted to the drone brood), powdered sugar dusting (which encourages cleaning behavior and dislodges some mites), screened bottom boards (so any dislodged mites fall through the bottom and away from the colony), brood interruption and, perhaps, downsizing of the brood cell size.

=== Acarine (tracheal) mites ===
Acarapis woodi is a parasitic mite that infests the trachea that lead from the first pair of thoracic spiracles. An unidentified bee illness was first reported on the Isle of Wight in England in 1904, becoming known as the 'Isle of Wight disease' (IoWD), which was initially thought to be caused by Acarapis woodi when it was identified in 1921 by Rennie. The IoWD disease quickly spread to the rest of Great Britain and Ireland, dealing a devastating blow to British and Irish beekeeping, being claimed as having wiped out the indigenous bee population of the British Isles. In 1991 Bailey and Ball stated "The final opinion of Rennie (1923), a co-discoverer of Acarapis woodi, who had much experience with bees said to have the Isle of Wight Disease, was that under the original and now quite properly discarded designation 'Isle of Wight Disease' were included several maladies having analogous superficial symptoms", the authors came to the firm conclusion that the IoWD was not caused by acarine (Acarapis woodi) mites solely, but primarily by chronic bee paralysis virus (CBPV), even though Acarapis woodi was always found to be present within the hive whenever CBPV symptoms were observed. Brother Adam at Buckfast Abbey developed a resistant bee breed known as the Buckfast bee, which is now available worldwide.

Diagnosis for tracheal mites generally involves the dissection and microscopic examination of a sample of bees from the hive.

Acarapis woodi are believed to have entered the U.S. in 1984, from Mexico.

Mature female acarine mites leave the bee's airway and climb out on a hair of the bee, where they wait until they can transfer to a young bee. Once on the new bee, they move into the airways and begin laying eggs.

==== Treatment ====
Acarine mites are commonly controlled with grease patties (typically made from one part vegetable shortening mixed with three to four parts powdered sugar) placed on the top bars of the hive. The bees come to eat the sugar and pick up traces of shortening, which disrupts the mite's ability to identify a young bee. Some of the mites waiting to transfer to a new host remain on the original host. Others transfer to a random bee—a proportion of which will die of other causes before the mite can reproduce.

Menthol, either allowed to vaporize from crystal form or mixed into the grease patties, is also often used to treat acarine mites.

=== Nosema disease ===
Nosema apis is a microsporidian that invades the intestinal tracts of adult bees and causes Nosema disease, also known as nosemosis. Nosema infection is also associated with black queen cell virus. It spreads via fecal to oral matter to infect bees. It is normally only a problem when the bees cannot leave the hive to eliminate waste (for example, during an extended cold spell in winter or when the hives are enclosed in a wintering barn). When the bees are unable to void (cleansing flights), they can develop dysentery.

Nosema disease is treated by increasing the ventilation through the hive. Some beekeepers treat hives with agents such as fumagillin.

Nosemosis can also be prevented or minimized by removing much of the honey from the beehive, then feeding the bees on sugar water in the late fall. Sugar water made from refined sugar has lower ash content than flower nectar, reducing the risk of dysentery. Refined sugar, however, contains fewer nutrients than natural honey, which causes some controversy among beekeepers.

In 1996, a similar type of organism to N. apis was discovered on the Asian honey bee Apis cerana and subsequently named N. ceranae. This parasite apparently also infects the western honey bee.

Exposure to corn pollen containing genes for Bacillus thuringiensis (Bt) production may weaken the bees' defense against Nosema. In relation to feeding a group of bees with Bt corn pollen and a control group with non-Bt corn pollen: "in the first year, the bee colonies happened to be infested with parasites (microsporidia). This infestation led to a reduction in the number of bees and subsequently to reduced broods in the Bt-fed colonies, as well as in the colonies fed on Bt toxin-free pollen. The trial was then discontinued at an early stage. This effect was significantly more marked in the Bt-fed colonies. (The significant differences indicate an interaction of toxin and pathogen on the epithelial cells of the honeybee intestine. The underlying mechanism which causes this effect is unknown.)"

This study should be interpreted with caution given that no repetition of the experiment nor any attempt to find confounding factors was made. In addition, Bt toxin and transgenic Bt pollen showed no acute toxicity to any of the life stages of the bees examined, even when the Bt toxin was fed at concentrations 100 times that found in transgenic Bt pollen from maize.

Nosema disease is very common when bees get into winter clusters, as they spend an extensive time in their hives as they keep together for warmth and have little to no opportunities to eliminate waste.

=== Small hive beetle ===
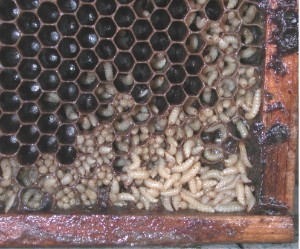
Comb slimed by hive beetle larvae. The larvae introduce a yeast to the honeycomb that causes honey to ferment and run out of cells. Hives infested at this level will drive out bee colonies.

Aethina tumida is a small, dark-colored beetle that lives in beehives. Originally from Africa, the first discovery of small hive beetles in the Western Hemisphere was made in St. Lucie County, Florida, in 1998. The next year, a specimen that had been collected from Charleston, South Carolina, in 1996 was identified, and is believed to be the index case for the United States. By December 1999, small hive beetles were reported in Iowa, Maine, Massachusetts, Minnesota, New Jersey, Ohio, Pennsylvania, Texas, and Wisconsin, and it was found in California by 2006.

The lifecycle of this beetle includes pupation in the ground outside of the hive. Controls to prevent ants from climbing into the hive are believed to also be effective against the hive beetle. Several beekeepers are experimenting with the use of diatomaceous earth around the hive as a way to disrupt the beetle's lifecycle. The diatoms abrade the insects' surfaces, causing them to dehydrate and die.

==== Treatment ====
Several pesticides are currently used against the small hive beetle. The chemical fipronil (marketed as Combat Roach Gel) is commonly applied inside the corrugations of a piece of cardboard. Standard corrugations are large enough that a small hive beetle can enter the cardboard through the end, but small enough that honey bees cannot enter (thus are kept away from the pesticide). Alternative controls such as oil-based top-bar traps are also available, but they have had very little commercial success.

=== Wax moths ===
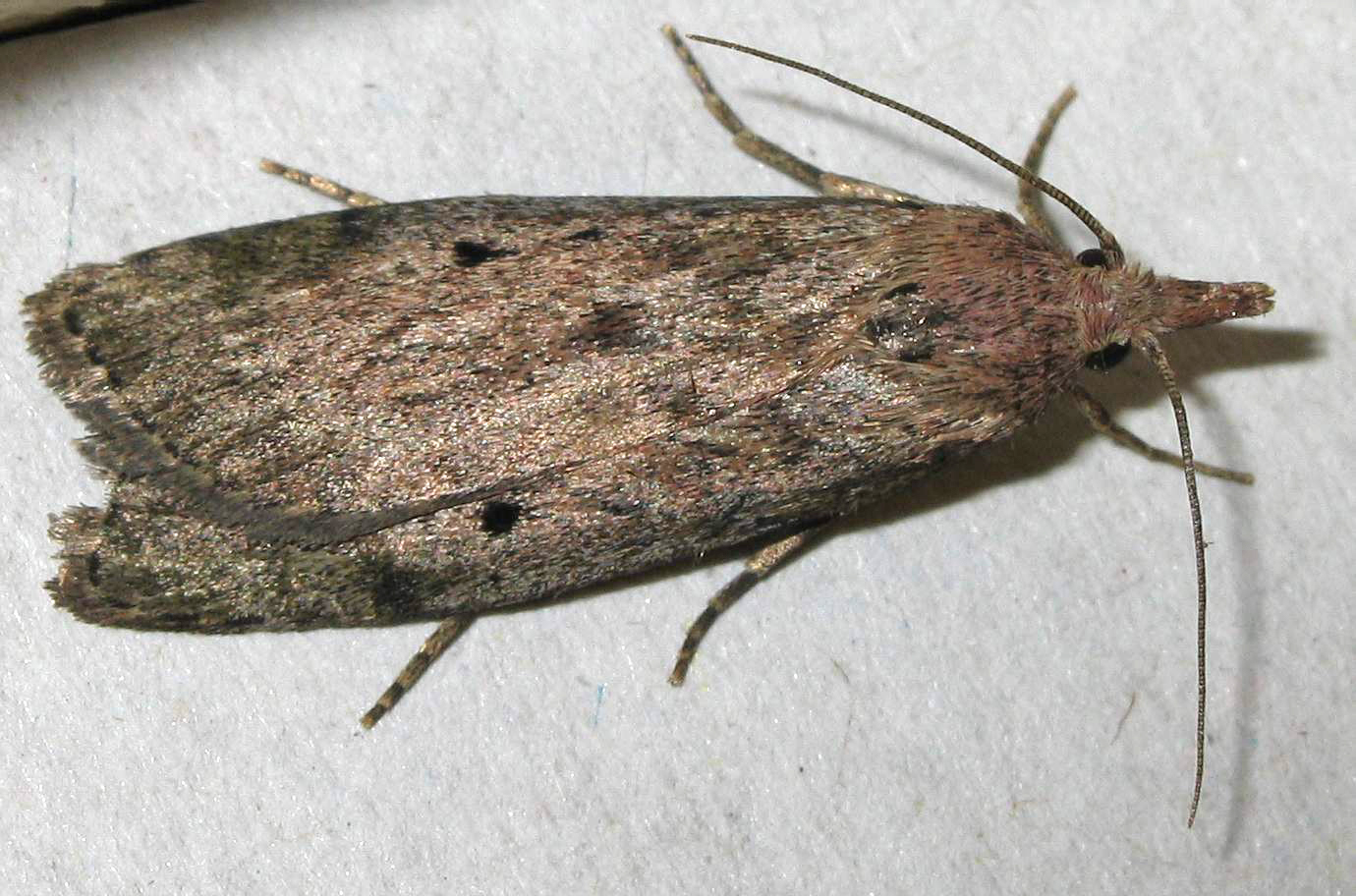
Wax moth (Aphomia sociella)—more often associated with bumble bees (Bombus sp.)

Galleria mellonella (greater wax moths) do not attack the bees directly, but feed on the shed exoskeletons of bee larvae and pollen that is found in dark brood comb, which was used by the bees to hold the developing bees. Their full development to adults requires access to used brood comb or brood cell cleanings—these contain protein essential for the larval development, in the form of brood cocoons. The destruction of the comb will spill or contaminate stored honey and may kill bee larvae.

When honey supers are stored for the winter in a mild climate, or in heated storage, the wax moth larvae can destroy portions of the comb, though they will not fully develop. Damaged comb may be scraped out and replaced by the bees. Wax moth larvae and eggs are killed by freezing, so storage in unheated sheds or barns in higher latitudes is the only control necessary.

Because wax moths cannot survive a cold winter, they are usually not a problem for beekeepers in the northern U.S. or Canada, unless they survive winter in heated storage, or are brought from the south by purchase or migration of beekeepers. They thrive and spread most rapidly with temperatures above 30 °C (90 °F), so some areas with only occasional days that are hot rarely have a problem with wax moths, unless the colony is already weak due to stress from other factors.

==== Control and treatment ====
A strong hive generally needs no treatment to control wax moths; the bees themselves kill and clean out the moth larvae and webs. Wax moth larvae may fully develop in cell cleanings when such cleanings accumulate thickly where they are not accessible to the bees.

Wax moth development in comb is generally not a problem with top bar hives, as unused combs are usually left in the hive during the winter. Since this type of hive is not used in severe wintering conditions, the bees are able to patrol and inspect the unused comb.

Wax moths can be controlled in stored comb by application of the aizawai variety of B. thuringiensis spores by spraying as a safe biological control.

Wax moths can be controlled chemically with paradichlorobenzene (moth crystals or urinal disks). If chemical methods are used, the combs must be well-aired for several days before use. The use of naphthalene (mothballs) is discouraged because it accumulates in the wax, which can kill bees or contaminate honey stores.

Control of wax moths by other means includes the freezing of the comb for a few hours. Langstroth found that placing a spider, such as a daddy-long-legs, with stored combs controlled wax moth and eliminate the need for hash chemicals. This has been confirmed more recently by others, such as Bergqvist.

=== Tropilaelaps ===
Tropilaelaps mercedesae and T. clareae are considered serious threats to honeybees. Although they are not currently found outside Asia, these mites have the potential to inflict serious damage to colonies due to their rapid reproduction inside the hive.

== Bacterial diseases ==
Symptoms
Appearance of brood comb	Age of dead brood	Color of dead brood	Consistency of dead brood	Odor of dead brood	Scale characteristics	Infectious agent
Sealed brood, discolored, sunken, or punctured cappings	Usually older sealed larvae or young pupae lying lengthwise in cells	Dull white, becoming light brown, coffee brown to dark brown, or almost black	Soft, becoming sticky to ropy	Slightly to pronounced putrid odor	Lies uniformly flat on lower side of cell, adheres tightly to cell wall, fine, thread-like tongue of dead may be present, head lies flat, black in color	American foulbrood
Unsealed brood, some sealed brood in advanced cases with discolored, sunken or punctured cappings	Usually young unsealed larvae, occasionally older sealed larvae, typically in coiled stage	Dull white, becoming yellowish white to brown, dark brown, or almost black	Watery, rarely sticky or ropy, granular	Slightly to penetrating sour	Usually twisted in cell, does not adhere to cell wall, rubbery, black in color	European foulbrood

=== American foulbrood ===
American foulbrood (AFB), caused by the spore-forming Paenibacillus larvae (formerly classified as Bacillus larvae, then P. larvae ssp. larvae/pulvifaciens), is the most widespread and destructive of the bee brood diseases. P. larvae is a rod-shaped bacterium. Larvae up to three days old become infected by ingesting spores present in their food. Young larvae less than 24 hours old are most susceptible to infection. Spores germinate in the gut of the larva and the vegetative bacteria begin to grow, taking nourishment from the larva. Spores will not germinate in larvae over three days old. Infected larvae normally die after their cell is sealed. The vegetative form of the bacterium will die, but not before it produces many millions of spores. American foulbrood spores are extremely resistant to desiccation and can remain viable for 80 years in honey and beekeeping equipment. Each dead larva may contain as many as 100 million spores. This disease only affects the bee larvae, but is highly infectious and deadly to bee brood. Infected larvae darken and die.

As with European foulbrood, research has been conducted using the "shook swarm" method to control American foulbrood, "the advantage being that chemicals are not used".

=== European foulbrood ===
European foulbrood (EFB) is caused by the bacterium Melissococcus plutonius that infects the midgut of bee larvae. European foulbrood is considered less serious than American foulbrood. M. plutonius is not a spore-forming bacterium, but bacterial cells can survive for several months on wax foundation. Symptoms include dead and dying larvae which can appear curled upwards, brown or yellow, melted or deflated with tracheal tubes more apparent, or dried out and rubbery. method Scientific research showed that the spread of the disease is density dependent. The higher the density of apiaries, the higher the probability of disease transmission.

European foulbrood is often considered a "stress" disease—dangerous only if the colony is already under stress for other reasons. An otherwise healthy colony can usually survive European foulbrood.

Chemical treatment with oxytetracycline hydrochloride may control an outbreak of the disease, but honey from treated colonies could have chemical residues from the treatment, and prophylactic treatments are not recommended as they may lead to resistant bacteria.

The "shook swarm" method of bee husbandry can also effectively control the disease, with the advantage of avoiding the use of chemicals.

The Alexander-House-Miller treatment has also been shown to be effective against the disease. The method requires the hive to be strong and the queen to be prevented from laying for a week or so. A modified version of this method is given by Carr in his article. The queen is placed on frames of foundation below a queen excluder, and all of the brood frames are put above the excluder. Once all of the worker brood has emerged, these frames are removed from the hive and the old comb in them replaced with foundation ready for re-use.

== Fungal diseases ==
=== Chalkbrood ===
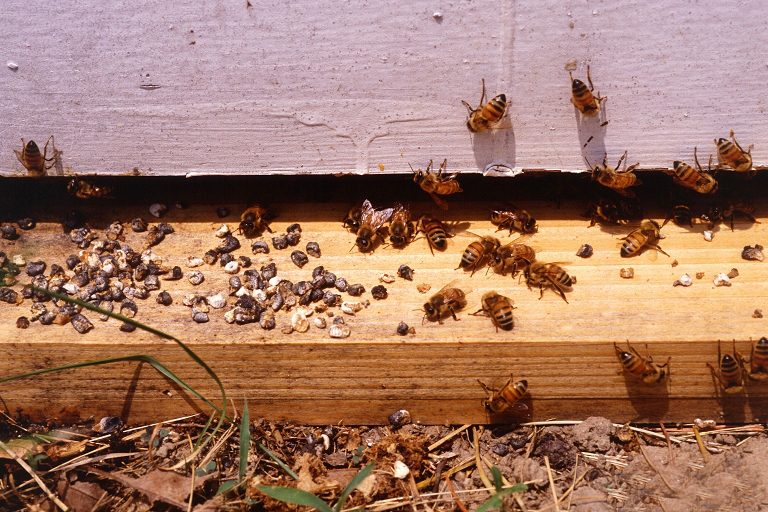
The entrance to this beehive is littered with chalkbrood mummies that have been expelled from the hive by hygienic worker bees.

Ascosphaera apis causes a fungal disease that only affects bee brood, but adult bees can be carriers. It infests the gut of the larvae before the cell is sealed or soon after. The fungus competes with them for food, ultimately causing them to starve. The fungus then goes on to consume the rest of the larval bodies, causing them to appear white, hard, and "chalky". If fungal spores start to develop, the larva can also appear gray or black. One study suggested it could be economically devastating because not only does it weaken the hive, but it can cause honey reductions of 5–37%.

Chalkbrood (ascosphaerosis larvae apium) is most commonly visible during wet springs. Hedtke et al. provided statistical evidence that chalkbrood outbreaks occurred in summer when there was a N. ceranae infection earlier in the spring and there is an ongoing V. destructor infestation. Stress, genetics of the bees, and health can also be contribute to the presence of chalkbrood.

Spores of the fungus can last for up to 15 years, which is why old equipment from a previously infected hive should not be used. These spores can last in pollen, honey, and wax. Even though Hornitzky's literature review of articles on chalkbrood disease concluded that there was no definitive cure or control, there are a variety of prevention mechanisms. Improving genetic stock to be more hygienic, sterilization of old equipment, good ventilation and the replacement of old brood comb are all techniques that can be attempted.

Chalkbrood was first recognized in 1900s in Europe, and then spread to countries such as Argentina, Turkey, Philippines, Mexico, Chile, Central America and Japan. It was first recorded in the United States in the mid-1960s in Utah and spread across the US from there.

=== Stonebrood ===
Stonebrood (aspergillosis larvae apium) is a fungal disease caused by Aspergillus fumigatus, A. flavus, and A. niger. It causes mummification of the brood of a honey bee colony. The fungi are common soil inhabitants and are also pathogenic to other insects, birds, and mammals. The disease is difficult to identify in the early stages of infection. The spores of the different species have different colours and can also cause respiratory damage to humans and other animals. When bee larvae take in spores, they may hatch in the gut, growing rapidly to form a collar-like ring near the larval heads. After death, the larvae turn black and become difficult to crush, hence the name stonebrood. Eventually, the fungus erupts from the integument of the larvae and forms a false skin. In this stage, the larvae are covered with powdery fungal spores. Worker bees clean out the infected brood and the hive may recover depending on factors such as the strength of the colony, the level of infection, and hygienic habits of the strain of bees (variation in the trait occurs among different subspecies).

== Viral diseases ==
=== Dicistroviridae ===
==== Chronic bee paralysis virus ====
- Syndrome 1 result in abnormal trembling of the wings and body. The bees cannot fly, and often crawl on the ground and up plant stems. In some cases, the crawling bees can be found in large numbers (1000+). The bees huddle together on the top of the cluster or on the top bars of the hive. They may have bloated abdomens due to distension of the honey sac. The wings are partially spread or dislocated.
- Syndrome 2-affected bees are able to fly, but are almost hairless. They appear dark or black and look smaller. They have a relatively broad abdomen. They are often nibbled by older bees in the colony and this may be the cause of the hairlessness. They are hindered at the entrance to the hive by the guard bees. A few days after infection, trembling begins. They then become flightless and soon die.

In 2008, the chronic bee paralysis virus was reported for the first time in Formica rufa and another species of ant, Camponotus vagus.

==== Acute bee paralysis virus ====
Acute bee paralysis virus is considered to be a common infective agent of bees. It belongs to the family Dicistroviridae, as does the Israel acute paralysis virus, Kashmir bee virus, and the black queen cell virus. It is frequently detected in apparently healthy colonies. This virus seemingly plays a role in cases of sudden collapse of honey bee colonies infested with the parasitic mite V. destructor.

==== Israeli acute paralysis virus ====
Described in 2004 the Israeli acute paralysis virus belongs to the family Dicistroviridae, as does the Acute bee paralysis virus. The virus is named after the place where it was first identified – its place of origin is unknown. It has been suggested as a marker associated with colony collapse disorder.

==== Kashmir bee virus ====
Kashmir bee virus is related to the preceding viruses. Discovered in 2004, it is currently only positively identifiable by a laboratory test. Little is known about it yet.

==== Black queen cell virus ====
Black queen cell virus causes the queen larva to turn black and die. It is thought to be associated with Nosema.

==== Cloudy wing virus ====
Cloudy wing virus is a little-studied, small, icosahedral virus commonly found in honey bees, especially in collapsing colonies infested by V. destructor, providing circumstantial evidence that the mite may act as a vector.

==== Sacbrood virus ====
A picornavirus-like virus causes sacbrood disease. Affected larvae change from pearly white to gray and finally black. Death occurs when the larvae are upright, just before pupation. Consequently, affected larvae are usually found in capped cells. Head development of diseased larvae is typically delayed. The head region is usually darker than the rest of the body and may lean toward the center of the cell. When affected larvae are carefully removed from their cells, they appear to be a sac filled with water. Typically, the scales are brittle but easy to remove. Sacbrood-diseased larvae have no characteristic odor.

=== Iflaviridae ===
==== Deformed wing virus ====
Deformed wing virus (DWV) is the causative agent of the wing deformities and other body malformations typically seen in honeybee colonies that are heavily infested with the parasitic mite V. destructor. DWV is part of a complex of closely related virus strains/species that also includes Kakugo virus, V. destructor virus 1 and Egypt bee virus. This deformity can clearly be seen on the honeybee's wings in the image. The deformities are produced almost exclusively due to DWV transmission by V. destructor when it parasitizes pupae. Bees infected as adults remain symptom-free, although they do display behavioral changes and have reduced life expectancy. Deformed bees are rapidly expelled from the colony, leading to a gradual loss of adult bees for colony maintenance. If this loss is excessive and can no longer be compensated by the emergence of healthy bees, the colony rapidly dwindles and dies.

==== Kakugo virus ====
Kakugo virus is an Iflavirus infecting bees; varroa mites may mediate its prevalence. Kakugo virus appears to be a subtype of Deformed wing virus.

==== Slow bee paralysis virus ====
As the name suggests, slow bee paralysis virus induces paralysis to the anterior legs ten to twelve days after infection.

=== Iridoviridae ===
==== Invertebrate iridescent virus type 6 (IIV-6) ====
Applying proteomics-based pathogen screening tools in 2010, researchers announced they had identified a co-infection of an Iridovirus; specifically invertebrate iridescent virus type 6 (IIV-6) and N. ceranae in all CCD colonies sampled. On the basis of this research, The New York Times reported the colony collapse mystery solved, quoting researcher Bromenshenk, a co-author of the study, "[The virus and fungus] are both present in all these collapsed colonies." Evidence for this association, however, remains minimal and several authors have disputed the original methodology used to associate CCD with IIV-6.

=== Secoviridae ===
==== Tobacco ringspot virus ====
The RNA virus tobacco ringspot virus, a plant pathogen, was described to infect honeybees through infected pollen, but this unusual claim was soon challenged and remains to be confirmed.

==== Lake Sinai virus ====
In 2015, Lake Sinai virus (LSV) genomes were assembled and three main domains were discovered: Orf1, RNA-dependent RNA polymerase and capsid protein sequences. LSV1, LSV2, LSV3, LSV4, LSV5, and LSV6 were described. LSV were detected in bees, mites and pollen. It only actively replicates in honey bees and mason bees (Osmia cornuta) and not in Varroa mites.

== Dysentery ==
Dysentery is a condition resulting from a combination of long periods of inability to make cleansing flights (generally due to cold weather) and food stores that contain a high proportion of indigestible matter. As a bee's gut becomes engorged with feces that cannot be voided in flight as preferred by the bees, the bee voids within the hive. When enough bees do this, the hive population rapidly collapses and death of the colony results. Dark honeys and honeydews have greater quantities of indigestible matter.

Occasional warm days in winter are critical for honey bee survival; dysentery problems increase in likelihood during periods of more than two or three weeks with temperatures below 50 °F (10 °C). When cleansing flights are few, bees are often forced out at times when the temperature is barely adequate for their wing muscles to function, and large quantities of bees may be seen dead in the snow around the hives. Colonies found dead in spring from dysentery have feces smeared over the frames and other hive parts.

In very cold areas of North America and Europe, where honey bees are kept in ventilated buildings during the coldest part of winter, no cleansing flights are possible; under such circumstances, beekeepers commonly remove all honey from the hives and replace it with sugar water or high-fructose corn syrup, which have nearly no indigestible matter.

== Chilled brood ==
Chilled brood is not actually a disease, but can be a result of mistreatment of the bees by the beekeeper. It also can be caused by a pesticide hit that primarily kills off the adult population, or by a sudden drop in temperature during rapid spring build-up. The brood must be kept warm at all times; nurse bees will cluster over the brood to keep it at the right temperature. When a beekeeper opens the hive (to inspect, remove honey, check the queen, or just to look) and prevents the nurse bees from clustering on the frame for too long, the brood can become chilled, deforming or even killing some of the bees.

== Pesticide losses ==
Honey bees are susceptible to many of the chemicals used for agricultural spraying of other insects and pests. Many pesticides are known to be toxic to bees. Because the bees forage up to several miles from the hive, they may fly into areas actively being sprayed by farmers or they may collect pollen from contaminated flowers.

Carbamate pesticides, such as carbaryl, can be especially pernicious since toxicity can take as long as two days to become evident, allowing infected pollen to be returned and distributed throughout the colony. Organophosphates and other insecticides are also known to kill honey bee clusters in treated areas.

Pesticide losses may be relatively easy to identify (large and sudden numbers of dead bees in front of the hive) or quite difficult, especially if the loss results from a gradual accumulation of pesticide brought in by the foraging bees. Quick-acting pesticides may deprive the hive of its foragers, dropping them in the field before they can return home.

Insecticides that are toxic to bees have label directions that protect the bees from poisoning as they forage. To comply with the label, applicators must know where and when bees forage in the application area, and the length of residual activity of the pesticide.

Some pesticide authorities recommend, and some jurisdictions require, that notice of spraying be sent to all known beekeepers in the area, so they can seal the entrances to their hives and keep the bees inside until the pesticide has had a chance to disperse. This, however, does not solve all problems associated with spraying and the label instructions should be followed regardless of doing this. Sealing honey bees from flight on hot days can kill bees. Beekeeper notification does not offer any protection to bees, if the beekeeper cannot access them, or to wild native or feral honey bees. Thus, beekeeper notification as the sole protection procedure does not really protect all the pollinators of the area, and is, in effect, a circumventing of the label requirements. Pesticide losses are a major factor in pollinator decline.

== Colony collapse disorder ==
Colony collapse disorder (CCD) is a poorly understood phenomenon in which worker bees from a beehive or western honey bee colony abruptly disappear. CCD was originally discovered in Florida by David Hackenberg in western honey bee colonies in late 2006.

European beekeepers observed a similar phenomenon in Belgium, France, the Netherlands, Greece, Italy, Portugal, and Spain, and initial reports have also come in from Switzerland and Germany, albeit to a lesser degree. Possible cases of CCD have also been reported in Taiwan since April 2007.

Initial hypotheses were wildly different, including environmental change-related stresses, malnutrition, pathogens (i.e., disease including Israel acute paralysis virus), mites, or the class of pesticides known as neonicotinoids, which include imidacloprid, clothianidin, and thiamethoxam. Most new research suggests the neonicotinoid hypothesis was incorrect, however, and that pesticides play little role in CCD compared to Varroa and Nosema infestations. Other theories included radiation from cellular phones or other man-made devices and genetically modified crops with pest-control characteristics,. In 2010, U.S. researchers announced they had identified a co-infection of invertebrate iridescent virus type 6 (IIV-6) and N. ceranae in all CCD colonies sampled.
