= Bee line =

A bee line is an idiom for the shortest route or a straight line between two points (see "as the crow flies"). Bee line, bee-line, or beeline may also refer to:

== Brands and enterprises ==
- Beeline (brand), a telecommunications brand by VimpelCom Ltd. used in Russia, other post-Soviet states, Laos, Cambodia and Vietnam
- Beeline reader for adding colors to text to speed reading transitions from one line to the next

== Transportation ==
- Bee Line Buzz Company, a former bus operator in Greater Manchester, United Kingdom
- Bee Line Expressway, an earlier name of Florida State Road 528 east of Orlando in the United States
- Bee Line Railroad, a railway in western Indiana, United States; serving Warren County and Benton County
- BEE-LINE, Brussels Airlines callsign
- Bee-Line Bus System of Westchester County, New York, United States
- Beeline, or Okmulgee Beeline, the section of U.S. Route 75 from Tulsa to Okmulgee, Oklahoma, United States
- Beeline Highway (disambiguation), several highways
- First Beeline, bus operator in Berkshire, England
- Beeline Britain, a project to travel from Land's End to John o'Groats in a straight line

== Other uses ==
- Beeline (album), a 2002 album by Peter Case
- Beeline (beekeeping), a method for locating a feral bee hive
- Vermilion snapper, a species of fish

== See also ==
- Bee Network, a transport service in Manchester
- Bee Card (New Zealand), a public transport ticketing system in New Zealand
- B Line (disambiguation)
