= B Train =

B Train may refer to:

- The B (New York City Subway service) in New York City
- The Green Line B branch in Boston, Massachusetts
- A B-Train or B-double, a road freight transport larger than a semi-trailer but not as long as a road train
- B Line (Los Angeles Metro), a rapid transit line in Los Angeles County, California
- B line, a rapid transit line in Philadelphia, Pennsylvania

== See also ==
- B Line (disambiguation)
