= B Line =

B Line, B-Line or Line B may refer to the following:

== Transportation ==
=== United States ===
- B (AC Transit), a bus route in the San Francisco Bay Area, California
- B (Los Angeles Railway), former streetcar service in Los Angeles, California
- B (New York City Subway service), a subway route in New York City, New York
- B (SEPTA Metro), a subway line in Philadelphia, Pennsylvania
- B Line (Los Angeles Metro), a rapid transit line in Los Angeles County, California
- B-Line (Norfolk Southern), a freight-rail line in Virginia
- B Line (RTD), a light-rail system in Denver, Colorado
- B Line (Valley Metro), a light rail line in Phoenix, Arizona
- Metro B Line (Minnesota), a rapid bus line in Minneapolis-Saint Paul, Minnesota
  - Riverview Corridor, previously known as the B Line
- RapidRide B Line, a bus route in King County, Washington
- Green Line B branch, a light-rail line in Boston, Massachusetts
  - B-Line Rivalry, a sports rivalry between Boston College and Boston University
- Butte Regional Transit, a bus system in Butte County, California, branded as "B-Line"

=== Elsewhere ===
- Line B (Buenos Aires Underground), an rapid transit line in Buenos Aires, Argentina
- B-Line (Hamilton), a proposed light-rail line in Hamilton, Ontario, Canada
- Line B (Prague Metro), a rapid transit line in Prague, Czech Republic
- Line B (Rennes Metro), a rapid transit line in Rennes, France
- Line B (Rome Metro), a rapid transit line in Rome, Italy
- B-Line (Sydney), a bus rapid transit system in Sydney, Australia
- B-Line (Vancouver), a bus rapid transit system in Vancouver, British Columbia, Canada
- Mexico City Metro Line B, a rapid transit line in Mexico

== Other uses ==
- "B Line" (song), a track on Lamb's album Fear of Fours
- The Eighties Matchbox B-Line Disaster, an English rock band
- Index register, in computing, per outdated British use
- A finding in lung ultrasound

== See also ==
- Bee line (disambiguation)
- B Train (disambiguation)
