= Apibacter =

Scientific classification
- Domain: Bacteria
- Kingdom: Pseudomonadati
- Phylum: Bacteroidota
- Class: Flavobacteriia
- Order: Flavobacteriales
- Family: Weeksellaceae
- Genus: Apibacter; Kwong and Moran 2016

Species
- Apibacter adventoris Apibacter mensalis Apibacter muscae Apibacter raozihei

Genus of bacteria

Apibacter is a genus of bacteria from the family Weeksellaceae.
