= Apibacter muscae =

Scientific classification
- Domain: Bacteria
- Kingdom: Pseudomonadati
- Phylum: Bacteroidota
- Class: Flavobacteriia
- Order: Flavobacteriales
- Family: Weeksellaceae
- Genus: Apibacter
- Species: A. muscae

Binomial name
- Apibacter muscae Park et al. 2019

Type strain
- G8

Bacterium

Apibacter muscae is a bacterium from the genus Apibacter which has been isolated from house flies.
