= Apibacter mensalis =

Scientific classification
- Domain: Bacteria
- Kingdom: Pseudomonadati
- Phylum: Bacteroidota
- Class: Flavobacteriia
- Order: Flavobacteriales
- Family: Weeksellaceae
- Genus: Apibacter
- Species: A. mensalis

Binomial name
- Apibacter mensalis Praet et al. 2016

Type strain
- LMG 28357

Bacterium

Apibacter mensalis is a bacterium from the genus Apibacter which has been isolated from the gut of bumblebees (Bombus lapidarius) from Ghent in Belgium.
