= Apibacter raozihei =

Scientific classification
- Domain: Bacteria
- Kingdom: Pseudomonadati
- Phylum: Bacteroidota
- Class: Flavobacteriia
- Order: Flavobacteriales
- Family: Weeksellaceae
- Genus: Apibacter
- Species: A. raozihei

Binomial name
- Apibacter raozihei Huang et al. 2020

Bacterium

Apibacter raozihei is a Gram-negative, rod-shaped, facultatively anaerobic and non-motile bacterium from the genus Apibacter which has been isolated from feces from the bat species Hipposideros and Taphozous from Chongqing in China.
