= Apibacter adventoris =

Scientific classification
- Domain: Bacteria
- Kingdom: Pseudomonadati
- Phylum: Bacteroidota
- Class: Flavobacteriia
- Order: Flavobacteriales
- Family: Weeksellaceae
- Genus: Apibacter
- Species: A. adventoris

Binomial name
- Apibacter adventoris Kwong and Moran, 2016

Bacterium

Apibacter adventoris is a mesophilic bacterium from the genus Apibacter which has been isolated from honey bees.
