= BeeLine Reader =

Accessibility software

BeeLine Reader is a software system which adds color gradients to digital text to improve reading ability and focus. The text at the end of each line is colored the same as the beginning of the next, so the color of the text acts as a flag post that directs the reader's eyes through the text more easily. In each line, the color of the text transitions from one color to another, with each character being slightly different than the preceding and following characters.

The system is available as an extension in Google Chrome and Mozilla Firefox, as a PDF viewer, and as an iOS app. These tools are mainly designed for use with web-based text but can also be used to read Amazon Kindle books on iPad and via browser extension. The tools suppress colors which already exist in text, such as the blue and red links in Wikipedia. Links are instead underlined.

The BeeLine Reader tools have a freemium model. The browser extension versions can be used up to five times per day, with unlimited daily uses for the first two weeks, at no charge, but further daily uses and other functionality require payment. This practice has been criticized by some reviewers for lack of transparency about the extension's pricing, with some expressing disappointment in a disability tool being paywalled at all and accusing the developers of preying on individuals with reading and attention disabilities.

The company's website lets readers compare their speed with and without the BeeLine colors. The system has won awards from the United Nations Solutions Summit, Stanford University and The Tech Museum of Innovation, and has been reviewed by educators.

== Adoption ==
BeeLine Reader's technology is patented and has been licensed by Blackboard's accessibility suite, the literacy nonprofit Reading Is Fundamental and the accessibility nonprofit Book share. California has bought a state-wide license for its libraries.

== Efficacy ==
The company claims that independent testing has shown that its technology increases reading fluency and reading comprehension. It also claims that BeeLine Reader has been shown to be effective as an assistive technology for special education students, in a study done by Book share. A pilot study done by CNET showed that readers using BeeLine Reader on CNET stories read nearly 50 percent further into articles than readers using conventional text.
