= Beeline Highway =

Beeline Highway may refer to:

- Beeline Highway (Arizona), State Route 87
- Beeline Highway (Florida), State Road 710
- Beeline Highway (auto trail)
