= Beeline (beekeeping) =

Feral honeybee colony locating technique

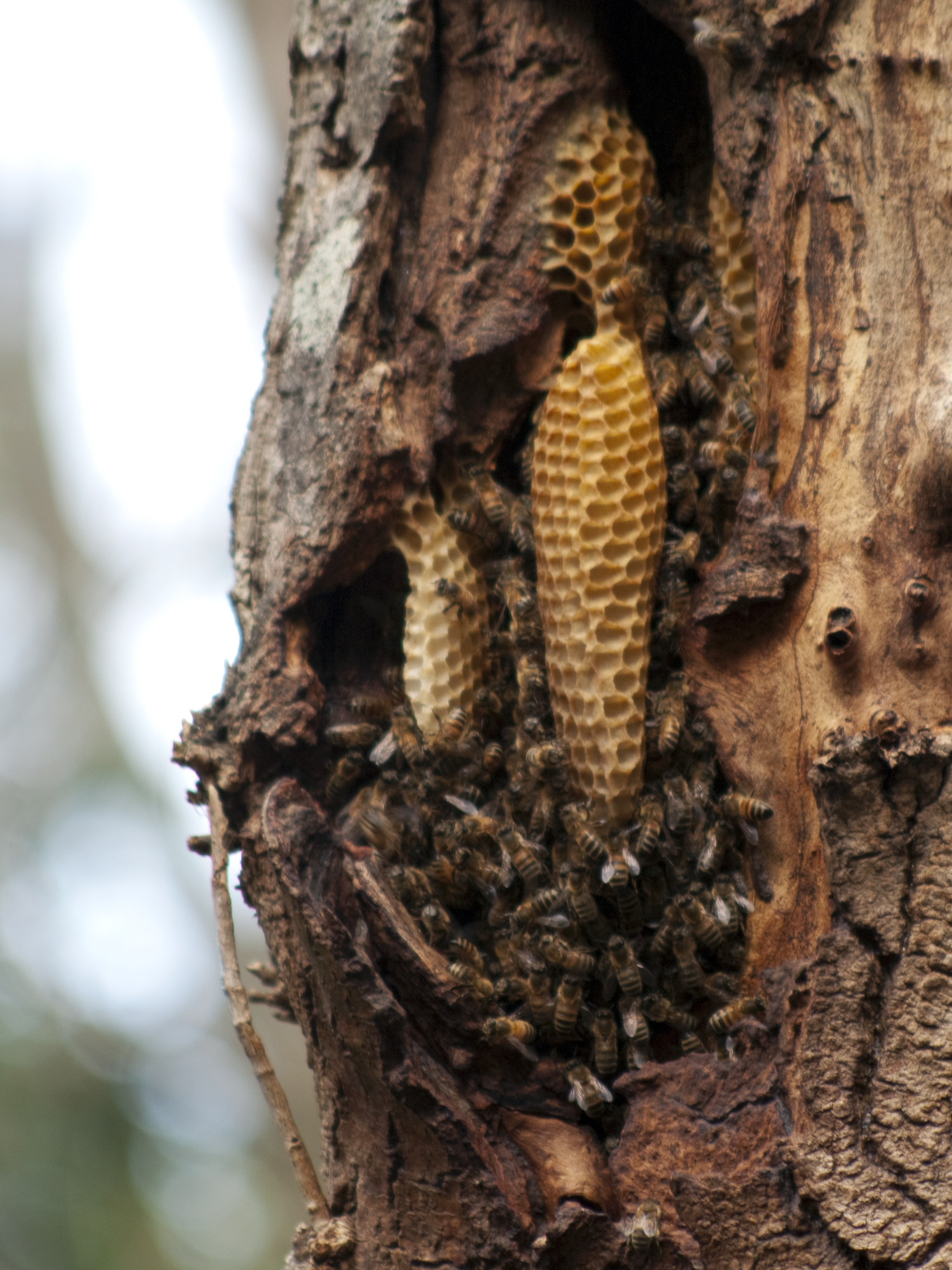
Bees in a natural hive, located at Coromandel Valley, South Australia.

Beelining (also known as bee lining, bee hunting, and coursing bees) is an ancient art used to locate feral bee colonies. It is performed by capturing and marking foraging worker bees, then releasing them from various points to establish (by elementary trigonometry) the direction and distance of the colony's home. Beeliners generally have homemade capture boxes which aid them in their quest.

Beelining was formerly a serious occupation in Appalachia where it was a means to obtain honey as a sweetener, and sometimes to capture wild colonies for domestication. When a hollow tree (gum) was found, it often was sawed above and below the colony and carried back to be set up as a kept hive near home. Honey was harvested from such colonies by "sulphuring", (using burning sulfur) to kill the insects.

Feral hives in the USA are uncommon since the arrival of varroa mites in the 1980s, and may represent an important, though small, pool of genetic resistance to the mites. Their value as potential breeding stock may far outweigh the value of their honey.
