= Rudow (surname) =

Rudow is a surname. Notable people with the surname include:

- Caleb Rudow, American politician
- Ferdinand Rudow (1840–1920), German entomologist
- Lucreția Suciu-Rudow (1859–1900), Romanian poet
- Vivian Adelberg Rudow (born 1936), American composer
