= Kakugo virus =

Virus classification
- (unranked): Virus
- Realm: Riboviria
- Kingdom: Orthornavirae
- Phylum: Pisuviricota
- Class: Pisoniviricetes
- Order: Picornavirales
- Family: Iflaviridae
- Genus: Iflavirus
- Species: Iflavirus aladeformis
- Virus: Kakugo virus

Virus which affects bees

Kakugo virus is a picorna-like virus found in the brains of worker bees. It is a subtype of Deformed wing virus. The Kakugo (Japanese for 'ready to attack') virus, when resident in a bee's brain, can contribute to aggressive behaviors similar to those preeminent during a bee's guard phase in their life cycle. Kakugo virus is the first virus to be discovered that has been claimed to cause aggressive behavior in honeybees.
