= List of Gelis species =

This is a list of 277 species in Gelis, a genus of ichneumon wasps in the family Ichneumonidae.

== Gelis species ==
- Gelis abortivus (Spinola, 1851)^{c g}
- Gelis acarorum (Linnaeus, 1758)^{c g}
- Gelis aciculatus (Strickland, 1912)^{c g}
- Gelis adili Bogacev, 1946^{c g}
- Gelis agilis (Fabricius, 1775)^{c g}
- Gelis alator Aubert, 1989^{c g}
- Gelis albanicus (Fahringer, 1923)^{c g}
- Gelis albicinctoides Schwarz, 1998^{c g}
- Gelis albicinctus (Ruthe, 1859)^{c g}
- Gelis albipalpus (Thomson, 1884)^{c g}
- Gelis albopilosus Schwarz, 2002^{c g}
- Gelis alegininus Carlson, 1979^{c g}
- Gelis algericus (Habermehl, 1920)^{c}
- Gelis alogus (Viereck, 1905)^{c g}
- Gelis alopecosae Horstmann, 1986^{c g}
- Gelis alpinus (Strobl, 1901)^{c g}
- Gelis alpivagus (Strobl, 1901)^{c g}
- Gelis alternatus (Cresson, 1872)^{c}
- Gelis anataelianus Ceballos, 1925^{c g}
- Gelis anatolicus Schwarz, 1998^{c g}
- Gelis aneichi Schwarz, 1998^{c g}
- Gelis annulatus (Strickland, 1912)^{c g}
- Gelis anthracinus (Forster, 1850)^{c}
- Gelis apantelicidus (Viereck, 1913)^{c g}
- Gelis apantelis Cushman, 1927^{c g}
- Gelis aponius Schwarz, 2002^{c g}
- Gelis apterus (Pontoppidan, 1763)^{c g}
- Gelis araneator Seyrig, 1926^{c g}
- Gelis areator (Panzer, 1804)^{c g}
- Gelis areolatus Ceballos, 1927^{c g}
- Gelis ariamus Schwarz, 1998^{c g}
- Gelis asozanus (Uchida, 1930)^{c g}
- Gelis asperatus (Fonscolombe, 1852)^{c g}
- Gelis athracinus (Förster, 1850)^{g}
- Gelis atratus (de Stefani, 1884)^{c g}
- Gelis austriacus Schwarz, 1998^{c g}
- Gelis avarus (Forster, 1850)^{c g}
- Gelis balcanicus Horstmann, 1993^{c g}
- Gelis balteatus (Cameron, 1905)^{c g}
- Gelis belfragei (Ashmead, 1890)^{c g}
- Gelis bellicus Bogacev, 1963^{c g}
- Gelis bicolor (Villers, 1789)^{c}
- Gelis bicoloratus (Cresson, 1872)^{c g}
- Gelis birkmani (Brues, 1903)^{c}
- Gelis brassicae Horstmann, 1986^{c g}
- Gelis brevicauda (Thomson, 1884)^{c g}
- Gelis brevis (Bridgman, 1883)^{c g}
- Gelis brevistylus (Strickland, 1912)^{c g}
- Gelis brevithorax Roman, 1936^{c g}
- Gelis bruesii (Strickland, 1912)^{c g}
- Gelis brunneellus Schwarz, 2002^{c g}
- Gelis californicus (Ashmead, 1890)^{c g}
- Gelis campbellensis Townes, 1964^{c g}
- Gelis canadensis (Cresson, 1872)^{c g}
- Gelis canariensis Horstmann, 1986^{c g}
- Gelis carbonarius (de Stefani, 1884)^{c g}
- Gelis caudator Horstmann, 1986^{c g}
- Gelis caudatulus Horstmann, 1997^{c g}
- Gelis caudatus (Rudow, 1917)^{c g}
- Gelis cayennator (Thunberg, 1822)^{c g}
- Gelis cinctus (Linnaeus, 1758)^{c}
- Gelis circumdatus (Schiodte, 1839)^{c g}
- Gelis claviventris (Strobl, 1901)^{c g}
- Gelis cockerelli (Brues, 1910)^{c g}
- Gelis coloradensis (Strickland, 1912)^{c g}
- Gelis columbianus (Ashmead, 1890)^{c g}
- Gelis compactus (Cresson, 1872)^{c g}
- Gelis constantineanui Ciochia, 1974^{c}
- Gelis crassulus (Brues, 1903)^{c g}
- Gelis cursitans (Fabricius, 1775)^{c g}
- Gelis curvicauda Horstmann, 1993^{c g}
- Gelis cushmani Carlson, 1979^{c g}
- Gelis cyanurus (Forster, 1850)^{c g}
- Gelis davidsonii (Ashmead, 1896)^{c g}
- Gelis debilis (Provancher, 1886)^{c g}
- Gelis declivis (Forster, 1850)^{c g}
- Gelis delicatus (Cresson, 1872)^{c}
- Gelis delumbis (Brues, 1910)^{c g}
- Gelis dendrolimi (Matsumura, 1926)^{c}
- Gelis difficilis (Hedwig, 1950)^{c g}
- Gelis dimidiativentris (Rudow, 1917)^{c g}
- Gelis discedens (Forster, 1850)^{c g}
- Gelis dispar (Strickland, 1912)^{c g}
- Gelis divaricatus Horstmann, 1993^{c g}
- Gelis drassi (Riley, 1892)^{c g}
- Gelis edentatus (Forster, 1850)^{c g}
- Gelis elongatus (Rudow, 1917)^{c g}
- Gelis elymi (Thomson, 1884)^{c g}
- Gelis escalerai Ceballos, 1925^{c g}
- Gelis exareolatus (Forster, 1850)^{c g}
- Gelis excellens (Hedwig, 1961)^{c g}
- Gelis fabularis Schwarz, 1998^{c g}
- Gelis falcatus Horstmann, 1986^{c g}
- Gelis fallax (Forster, 1850)^{c}
- Gelis fasciitinctus (Dalla Torre, 1901)^{c g}
- Gelis fenestralis (Brues, 1910)^{c g}
- Gelis ferruginosus (Strickland, 1912)^{c g}
- Gelis festinans (Fabricius, 1798)^{c g}
- Gelis formicarius (Linnaeus, 1758)^{c g}
- Gelis forticornis (Forster, 1850)^{c g}
- Gelis fortificator Aubert, 1980^{c g}
- Gelis fortunatus Schwarz, 1993^{c g}
- Gelis fossae Schwarz, 2002^{c g}
- Gelis foveatus (Brues, 1910)^{c g}
- Gelis fumipennis Horstmann, 1986^{c g}
- Gelis fuscicorniformis Ciochia, 1973^{c g}
- Gelis fuscicornis (Retzius, 1783)^{c g}
- Gelis gallicator (Aubert, 1971)^{c g}
- Gelis gelechiae (Ashmead, 1890)^{c g}
- Gelis gibbifrons (Thomson, 1884)^{c g}
- Gelis glacialis (Holmgren, 1869)^{c g}
- Gelis gracillimus (Dalla Torre, 1902)^{c}
- Gelis habilis (Brues, 1910)^{c g}
- Gelis hammari (Viereck, 1912)^{c g}
- Gelis hebraicator Aubert, 1971^{c g}
- Gelis heidenreichi Habermehl, 1930^{c g}
- Gelis helleni Kolarov, 1993^{c g}
- Gelis hispanicus Schwarz, 2002^{c g}
- Gelis hortensis (Christ, 1791)^{c g}
- Gelis hypsibatus Schwarz, 1998^{c g}
- Gelis inermis (Viereck, 1903)^{c g}
- Gelis infumatus (Thomson, 1884)^{c g}
- Gelis insolitus (Howard, 1897)^{c g}
- Gelis intermedius (Forster, 1850)^{c g}
- Gelis inustus (Gravenhorst, 1829)^{c g}
- Gelis inutilis Cushman, 1927^{c g}
- Gelis karakurti (Rossikov, 1904)^{c g}
- Gelis keenii (Harrington, 1894)^{c g}
- Gelis kiesenwetteri (Forster, 1850)^{c g}
- Gelis kukakensis (Ashmead, 1902)^{c}
- Gelis kumamotensis (Uchida, 1930)^{c g}
- Gelis latrodectiphagus (Hesse, 1942)^{c g}
- Gelis leiradoi Ceballos, 1925^{c g}
- Gelis lemae (Sonan, 1930)^{c}
- Gelis leptogaster (Forster, 1850)^{c}
- Gelis limbatus (Gravenhorst, 1829)^{c}
- Gelis liparae (Giraud, 1863)^{c g}
- Gelis longicauda (Thomson, 1884)^{c g}
- Gelis longipes (Strickland, 1912)^{c g}
- Gelis longistylus (Strickland, 1912)^{c g}
- Gelis lucidulus (Forster, 1850)^{c g}
- Gelis lymensis (Strickland, 1912)^{c g}
- Gelis macer (Cresson, 1872)^{c}
- Gelis macroptera (Strobl, 1901)^{c g}
- Gelis maculatus (Strickland, 1912)^{c g}
- Gelis maderi (Fahringer, 1923)^{c g}
- Gelis maesticolor (Roman, 1933)^{c g}
- Gelis mangeri (Gravenhorst, 1815)^{c g}
- Gelis manni (Strickland, 1912)^{c g}
- Gelis margaritae Bogacev, 1946^{c g}
- Gelis marikovskii Kuzin, 1948^{c g}
- Gelis maruyamensis (Uchida, 1932)^{c}
- Gelis meabilis (Cresson, 1872)^{c g}
- Gelis meigenii (Forster, 1850)^{c g}
- Gelis melampus (Strobl, 1901)^{c g}
- Gelis melanocephalus (Schrank, 1781)^{c g}
- Gelis melanogaster (Thomson, 1884)^{c g}
- Gelis melanogonus (Gravenhorst, 1829)^{c g}
- Gelis melanophorus (Forster, 1851)^{c g}
- Gelis merceti Ceballos, 1925^{c g}
- Gelis merops Schwarz, 2002^{c g}
- Gelis meuseli (Lange, 1911)^{c g}
- Gelis micariae (Howard, 1892)^{c g}
- Gelis micrurus (Forster, 1850)^{c g}
- Gelis minimus (Walsh, 1861)^{c g}
- Gelis mitis Schwarz, 1994^{c g}
- Gelis monozonius (Gravenhorst, 1829)^{c g}
- Gelis mutillatus (Gmelin, 1790)^{c g}
- Gelis nahanojus Schwarz, 1998^{c g}
- Gelis napocai Ciochia, 1974^{c g}
- Gelis nigerrimus (Dalla Torre, 1902)^{c g}
- Gelis nigritulus (Zetterstedt, 1838)^{c g}
- Gelis nigriventris (Brues, 1903)^{c g}
- Gelis nigrofuscus (Strickland, 1912)^{c g}
- Gelis nitidus Horstmann, 1986^{c g}
- Gelis nivariensis Schwarz, 1993^{c g}
- Gelis nocuus Cushman, 1927^{c g}
- Gelis notabilis (Forster, 1850)^{c g}
- Gelis obesus (Ashmead, 1902)^{c g}
- Gelis obscuratus (Strobl, 1901)^{c g}
- Gelis obscuripes Horstmann, 1986^{c g}
- Gelis obscurus (Cresson, 1872)^{c}
- Gelis operosus Schwarz, 2002^{c g}
- Gelis ornatulus (Thomson, 1884)^{c}
- Gelis ostarrichi Schwarz, 1996^{c g}
- Gelis ottawaensis (Harrington, 1896)^{c g}
- Gelis pallipes (Forster, 1851)^{c}
- Gelis pamirensis Bogacev, 1963^{c g}
- Gelis papaveris (Förster, 1856)^{c g}
- Gelis parens Schwarz, 1998^{c g}
- Gelis parfentjevi (Meyer, 1926)^{c g}
- Gelis pauxillus (Kokujev, 1909)^{c g}
- Gelis pavlovskii Jonaitis, 1981^{c g}
- Gelis pennsylvanicus (Strickland, 1912)^{c g}
- Gelis perniciosus (Viereck, 1913)^{c}
- Gelis petraeus Schwarz, 1998^{c g}
- Gelis pettitii (Cresson, 1872)^{c g}
- Gelis pezomachorum (Ratzeburg, 1852)^{c g}
- Gelis philpottii (Brues, 1922)^{c g}
- Gelis picipes (Gravenhorst, 1829)^{c g}
- Gelis piger (Kokujev, 1909)^{c g}
- Gelis pilosulus (Thomson, 1884)^{c g}
- Gelis popofensis (Ashmead, 1902)^{c g}
- Gelis potteri Barron, 1987^{c g}
- Gelis povolnyi Sedivy, 1968^{c g}
- Gelis problematicus (Seyrig, 1952)^{c g}
- Gelis problemator Aubert, 1989^{c g}
- Gelis prospectus Schwarz, 1998^{c g}
- Gelis prosthesimae (Riley, 1892)^{c g}
- Gelis proximus (Forster, 1850)^{c}
- Gelis pulicarius (Fabricius, 1793)^{c g}
- Gelis pusillus (de Stefani, 1884)^{c g}
- Gelis rabidae Barron, 1987^{c g}
- Gelis ragusae (de Stefani, 1884)^{c}
- Gelis recens Schwarz, 2002^{c g}
- Gelis robustus (Strickland, 1912)^{c g}
- Gelis rotundiceps (Cresson, 1872)^{c g}
- Gelis rotundiventris (Forster, 1850)^{c g}
- Gelis rubricollis (Thomson, 1884)^{c g}
- Gelis ruficeps (Rudow, 1914)^{c g}
- Gelis rufipes (Forster, 1850)^{c g}
- Gelis rufogaster Thunberg, 1827^{c g}
- Gelis rufoniger Schwarz, 1998^{c g}
- Gelis rufotinctus (Bridgman, 1883)^{c g}
- Gelis rugifer (Thomson, 1884)^{c g}
- Gelis sanguinipectus (Schmiedeknecht, 1932)^{c g}
- Gelis sapporoensis (Ashmead, 1906)^{c g}
- Gelis schizocosae Barron & Bisdee, 1977^{c g}
- Gelis scvarskii (Rossikov, 1904)^{c g}
- Gelis semirufus (de Stefani, 1884)^{c g}
- Gelis sessilis (Provancher, 1874)^{c g}
- Gelis seyrigi Ceballos, 1925^{c g}
- Gelis shafae Jonaitis & Alijev, 1988^{c g}
- Gelis shawidaani Schwarz, 2002^{c g}
- Gelis shushae Jonaitis & Alijev, 1988^{c g}
- Gelis sibiricus (Szépligeti, 1901)^{c}
- Gelis solus Schwarz, 2002^{c g}
- Gelis speciosus (Hellen, 1949)^{c g}
- Gelis spinula (Thomson, 1884)^{c g}
- Gelis spiraculus (Strickland, 1912)^{c g}
- Gelis spurius (Forster, 1850)^{c g}
- Gelis stanfordensis (Strickland, 1912)^{c g}
- Gelis stevenii (Gravenhorst, 1829)^{c g}
- Gelis stigmaterus (Cresson, 1872)^{c g}
- Gelis stigmaticus (Zetterstedt, 1838)^{c g}
- Gelis stigmatus (Ashmead, 1890)^{c g}
- Gelis stilatus (Rudow, 1914)^{c g}
- Gelis striativentris Schwarz, 2003^{c g}
- Gelis stricklandi Townes, 1944^{c g}
- Gelis takadai Momoi, 1970^{c g}
- Gelis tantillus (Cresson, 1872)^{c g}
- Gelis taschenbergii (Schmiedeknecht, 1897)^{c g}
- Gelis tauriscus Schwarz, 1998^{c g}
- Gelis tenellus (Say, 1835)^{c g b}
- Gelis tenerifensis Schwarz, 1993^{c g}
- Gelis terribilis Schwarz, 2002^{c g}
- Gelis texanus (Cresson, 1872)^{c}
- Gelis thersites (Schmiedeknecht, 1933)^{c g}
- Gelis thomsoni (Schmiedeknecht, 1933)^{c g}
- Gelis thripites (Taylor, 1860)^{c g}
- Gelis tibiator Schwarz, 2002^{c g}
- Gelis trux (Forster, 1850)^{c g}
- Gelis tubulosus (Fahringer, 1923)^{c g}
- Gelis turbator Schwarz, 2002^{c g}
- Gelis uniformis (Dalla Torre, 1902)^{c g}
- Gelis urbanus (Brues, 1910)^{c g}
- Gelis utahensis (Strickland, 1912)^{c g}
- Gelis vagabundus (Forster, 1850)^{c g}
- Gelis vasiljevi (Kokujev, 1912)^{c g}
- Gelis venatorius (Forster, 1850)^{c g}
- Gelis viduus (Forster, 1850)^{c g}
- Gelis virginiensis (Ashmead, 1890)^{c g}
- Gelis vulnerans (Forster, 1850)^{c g}
- Gelis westerhauseri Gistel, 1857^{c g}
- Gelis wheeleri (Brues, 1903)^{c g}
- Gelis yakutatensis (Ashmead, 1902)^{c g}
- Gelis zeirapherator (Aubert, 1966)^{c g}

Data sources: i = ITIS, c = Catalogue of Life, g = GBIF, b = Bugguide.net
