= Evolution of the Sacbrood Virus =

The evolution of the Sacbrood virus (SBV) is characterized by the genomic changes that have occurred in SBV since its initial discovery in 1913, which have enabled the virus to continuously infect a wide array of honeybee colonies. SBV is single stranded RNA virus (genus: Iflavirus) that most commonly infects honeybee larvae, and is known to wipe out entire honeybee colonies quickly. Due to SBV, there has been sharp declines in honey bee populations in Europe, as well as a 30% decline each year in U.S. colonies. Studies on the evolution of SBV have arisen in hopes to stop these colony devastations. SBV is one of the most widely studied honeybee viruses in terms of genomic analysis, leading to it having the highest number of complete genomes isolated compared to any other viruses known to honeybees. Through these genome studies, it has been found that there are two distinct lineages of SBV, each characterized by a high mutation rate, leading to multiple subtypes in both lineages. In studying how these lineages have evolved through time, new discoveries in their pathogenicity and different honeybee resistance mechanisms have been unveiled.

== General virology ==
SBV is one of the few viruses known to infect honeybees that researchers have been successful in sequencing the full genome for. SBV is a single stranded RNA virus. Its genome consists of one large open reading frame with 8,832 nucleotides as well as a poly-A tail are at the 3' end. Most of the structural genes are located at the 5' end of the genome and the non-structural genes at the 3' end. The virus contains a region that encodes a polyprotein, which is the precursor for the main functional proteins that are cleaved to form the capsid. The main functional capsid proteins are termed VP1, VP2, and VP3. Overall, the structure of this virus is similar to others in the Picornavirales order, but it has evolved a unique feature. The difference in SBV comes from the functional protein responsible for the viral genome delivery in host cells. In most Picornavirales, the capsid contains the functional protein VP4 for this. SBV, instead of having VP4, has a small protein attached to the surface of the capsid, called MiCP. Researchers believe it is this small protein that is responsible for forming pores on the capsid. The pores then enable the virus to inject its genome into the host cell. These pores will form on the capsid when exposed to and acidic pH, which would happen upon entry to any host cells.

== Evolutionary lineages ==
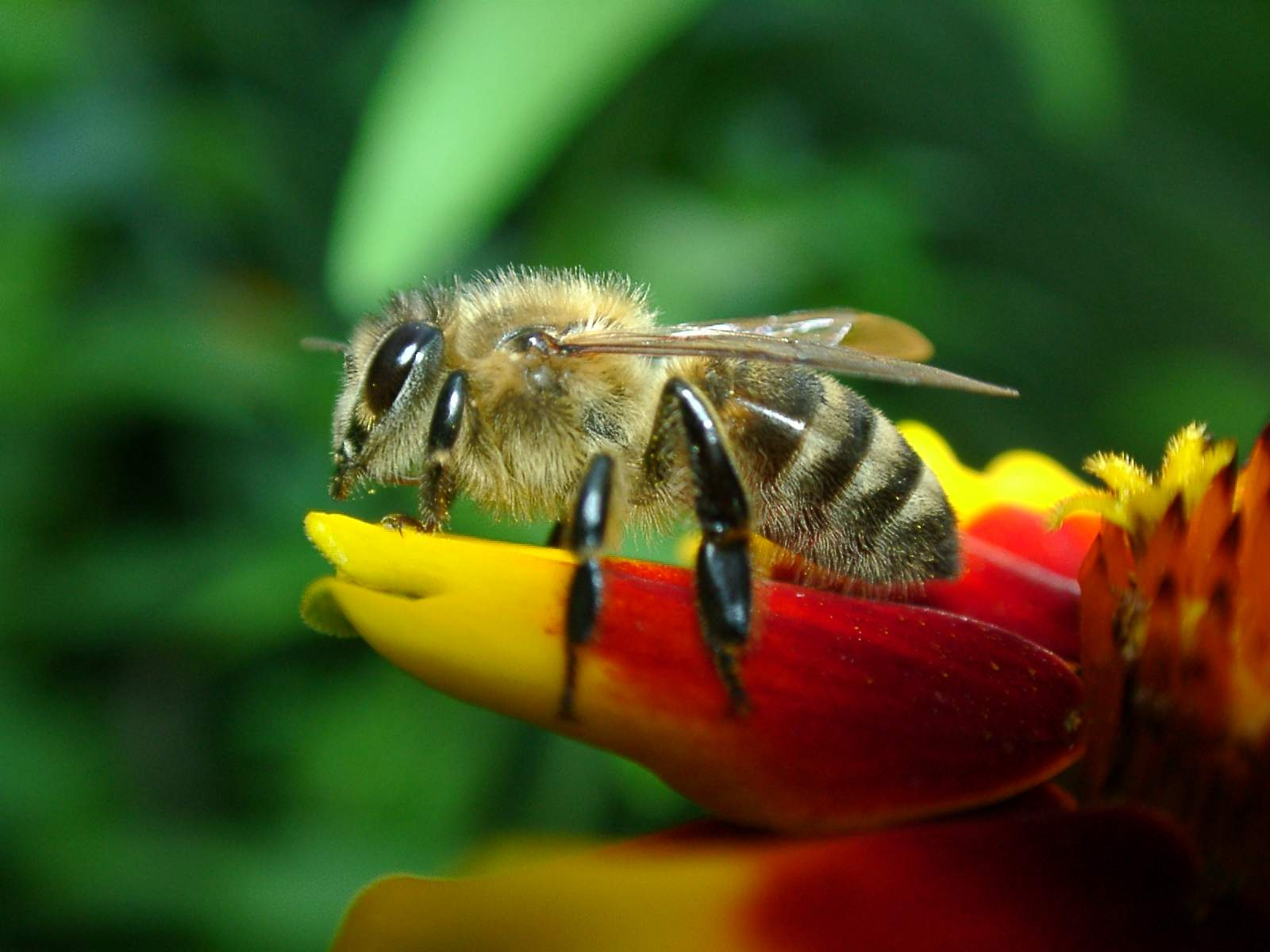
A. mellifera

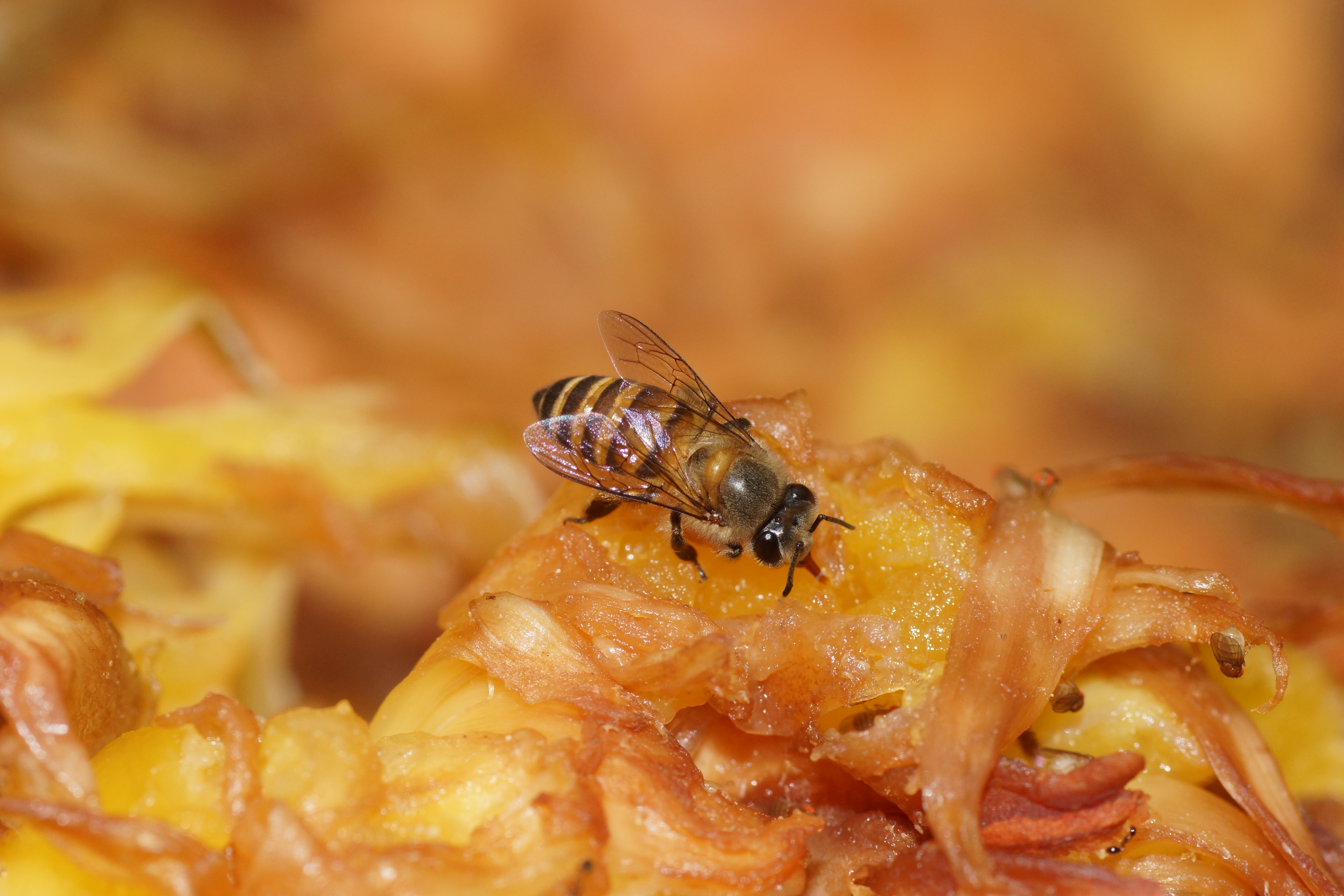
A. cerana

SBV has affected honeybees globally and is divided into two distinct lineages. The names of the lineages are derived from what species of honeybee they infect. The two types are termed AC genotype SBV and AM genotype SBV. AC genotype will infect A. cerana and AM genotype will infect A. mellifera. A. cerana is largely localized in many eastern countries, and there are different subgroups of the AC genotype depending on the region from which the virus was isolated. For example, the Chinese Sacbrood virus, CSBV, is arguably one of the most studied subgroups and is a subgroup of the AC genotype. The genomic sequence of the two lineages are slightly different, with the critical difference coming from genotypic changes in the region encoding the VP1 functional protein. These structural differences can explain the pathogenic differences seen in the two types. The differences in the subgroups of each lineage can be explained by SBV's high mutation rate. The high mutation rate is due to the fact that SBV does not proofread during RNA replication, leading to multiple strains in both lineages.

=== Apis cerana genotype ===
The AC genotype is more widely studied compared to the AM genotype. There are numerous strains in this lineage, most coming from China. The first major honeybee colony viral infestation of this genotype was in Guangdong Providence, China in 1972. It has since been identified in other countries like South Korea, India, and Thailand. The strain from the first major SBV colony infestation of this genotype was fully sequenced in 2001. Throughout the evolution of the AC lineage, there have been some major colony devastations due to SBV. Most notably, there was a 100% wipeout of A. cerana in Thailand in 1976. Now that two lineages have been identified, studies have found some differences between the AM genotype and AC genotype, in terms of pathogenicity, which have led to these colony devastations. The AC genotype is slightly more pathogenic and it is known to cause more detrimental effects in honeybee larvae than the AM genotype. Some of these detrimental effects include increased accumulation of ecdysial fluid, cuticle coloration, and possibly death. Death of honeybee larvae is significantly more prevalent in AC infections as opposed to AM. As for studies on the different subgroups in the AC genotype, they have revealed that the sequence changes between those do not cause significant changes in SBV's pathogenicity.

=== Apis mellifera genotype ===
Strains of the AM genotype have been identified and sequenced mainly in the U.S., U.K., Australia, and South Korea. Compared to the AC genotype, the AM genotype is less studied and has fewer complete genome sequences available. Though less studied overall, it was this genotype that led to the initial discovery of the virus. It was first identified in the U.S. in 1913. Compared to the high levels of infection with the AC genotype, the AM genotype is known to only infect about 15% of the species. Typically, the AM genotype does not cause lethal consequences in A. mellifera, which has peaked researchers interest on this species of honeybee and why this species of honeybee seem to be more resistant.

== New advances ==
=== Pathogenicity ===
Studies on the evolution of SBV have ramped up recently due to increased death in honeybees seen almost globally. The high mutations in SBV pose a constant threat to honeybee colonies, so understanding how the virus is evolving is a broadening topic in honeybee research. Recent studies have found that the AC genotype is capable of infecting A. mellifera, whereas it was thought previously that there was a species barrier between the two virus lineages. Another recent study found evidence that the virus is more pathogenic in cold weather, which would explain why it is more prevalent in the early spring time. The molecular mechanism behind this is currently unknown, but uncovering this in the future could help researchers and beekeepers with prevention protocols.

=== Resistance mechanisms ===
Since A. mellifera do not typically experience the same detrimental effects from SBV as A. cerana, this has led to studies trying to uncover possible means of resistance in A. mellifera. It has been reported that honeybee colonies that have better hygiene are more resistant to SBV. Since hygiene is a heritable behavioral trait in honeybees, a recent experimental evolution study selected colonies with better hygiene and examined their larvae survival rate over several generations. They found that after multiple generations the resistance to SBV continues to increase, which offers a possible evolutionary path that honeybees will see in the future. Honeybees with stronger immune systems that are able to resist infection from SBV will likely not only lead to positive selection in honeybees, but further drive the evolution of SBV to evade these mechanisms.
