= Tromsdorf =

- Stadtteil of Eckartsberga
- Interactive map of Tromsdorf
- Location within Germany Location within Saxony-Anhalt
- Coordinates: 51°7′N 11°29′E
- Country: Germany
- State: Saxony-Anhalt
- District: Burgenlandkreis
- Town: Eckartsberga

Area
  - Total: 9.14 km^{2} (3.53 sq mi)
- Elevation: 180 m (590 ft)

Population (2006-12-31)
  - Total: 392
  - Density: 42.9/km^{2} (111/sq mi)
- Time zone: UTC+01:00 (CET)
  - Summer (DST): UTC+02:00 (CEST)
- Postal codes: 06648
- Dialling codes: 034467

Tromsdorf (German pronunciation: [ˈtʁɔmsˌdɔʁf]) is a village and a former municipality in the Burgenlandkreis district, in Saxony-Anhalt, Germany. Since 1 July 2009, it is part of the town Eckartsberga.
