= Ludwig Abel =

German violinist, composer, and conductor

Ludwig Abel (14 January 1835 – 13 August 1895) was a German violinist, composer, and conductor.

== Life ==
Born in Eckartsberga, Province of Saxony, he was a pupil of Ferdinand David. He became a member of the Leipzig Gewandhaus Orchestra, and in 1853 moved to the court orchestra of Saxe-Weimar-Eisenach in Weimar. From 1860 he taught at the Charitable Society of Violin Playing. At the suggestion of the Bavarian Court Kapellmeister Hans von Bülow, whom he had met in Basel in 1866 and joined in organizing joint chamber music performances, Abel went on to become concertmaster of the court orchestra in Munich in 1867. He took up teaching at the Musikschule in Munich managed by Hans von Bülow, where he became Professor in 1880 and retired in 1894 he died in Berlin at age 60.

Abel's compositions included a violin concerto and a violin method as well as études and duos for violin.
