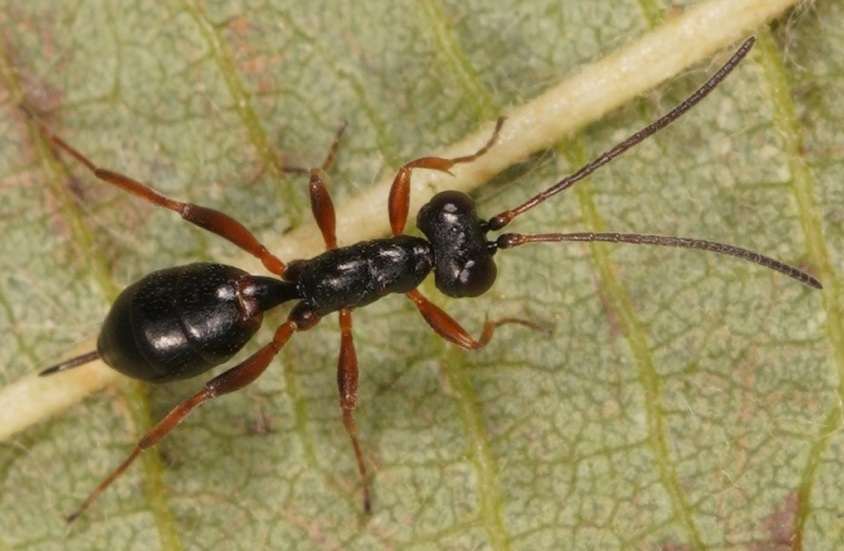

Scientific classification
- Kingdom: Animalia
- Phylum: Arthropoda
- Clade: Pancrustacea
- Class: Insecta
- Order: Hymenoptera
- Family: Ichneumonidae
- Genus: Gelis
- Species: G. agilis

Binomial name
- Gelis agilis (Fabricius 1775)

= Gelis agilis =

Species of wasp

Gelis agilis is a tiny wingless hyperparasitoid wasp that attacks the parasitoid wasp Cotesia glomerata and other parasitoids, like Dinocampus coccinellae. It reproduces asexually, with adult females feeding on their hosts' hemolymph in order to create eggs. It looks superficially like an ant and also produces ant-like alarm pheromones.
