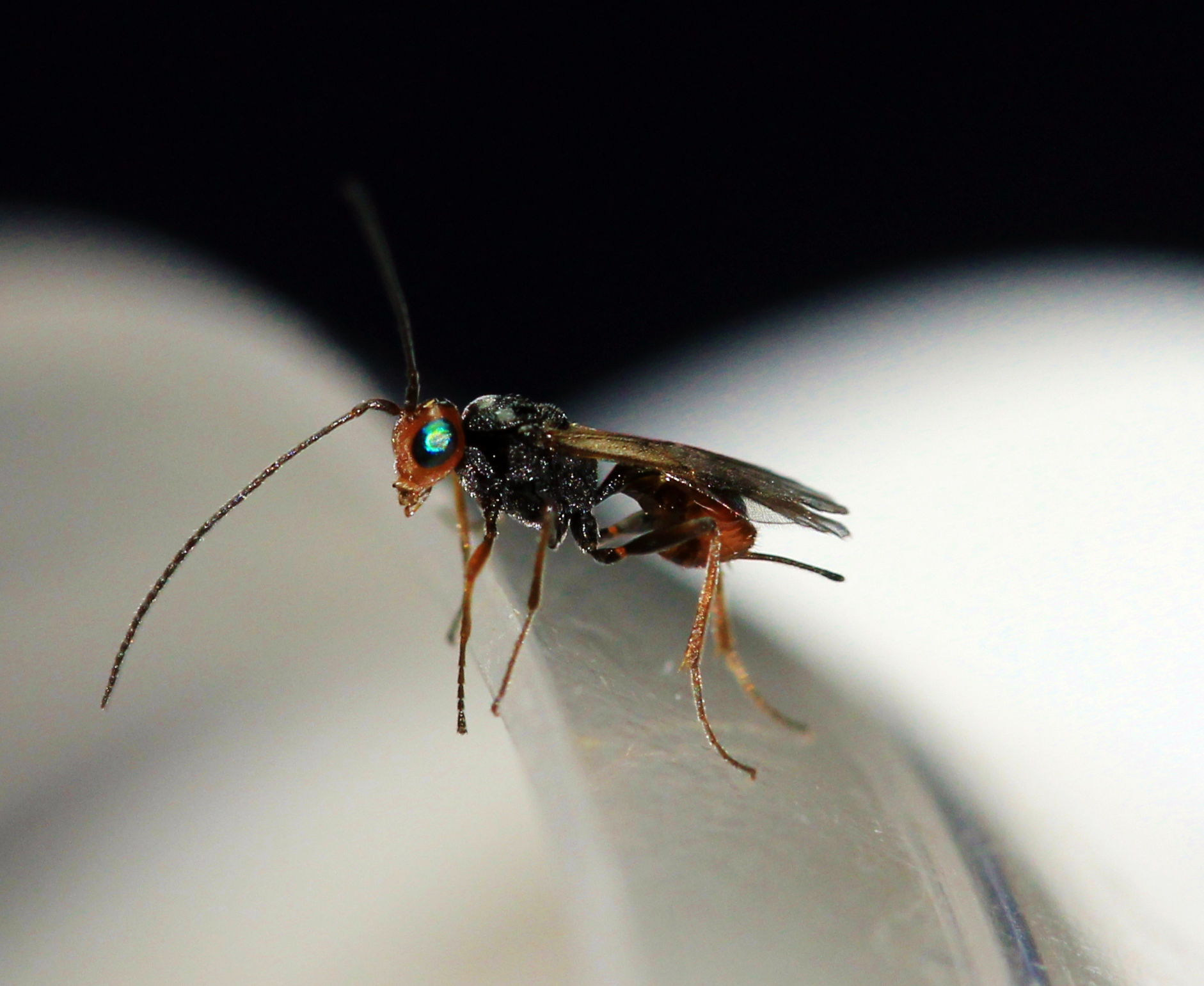

Scientific classification
- Kingdom: Animalia
- Phylum: Arthropoda
- Clade: Pancrustacea
- Class: Insecta
- Order: Hymenoptera
- Family: Braconidae
- Subfamily: Euphorinae
- Tribe: Dinocampini
- Genus: Dinocampus; Foerster, 1862
- Species: D. coccinellae

Binomial name
- Dinocampus coccinellae (Schrank, 1802)

Synonyms
- Ichneumon coccinellae; Bracon terminatus; Perilitus terminatus; Dinocampus terminatus; Euphorus sculptus; Perilitus americanus

= Dinocampus =

Genus of wasps

Dinocampus coccinellae is a braconid wasp parasite of coccinellid beetles, including the spotted lady beetle, Coleomegilla maculata. It is the only species in the genus Dinocampus. D. coccinellae has been described as turning its ladybird host into a temporary "zombie" guarding the wasp cocoon. About 25% of Coleomegilla maculata recover after the cocoon they are guarding matures, although the proportion of other ladybird species which recover is much lower.

== Description ==
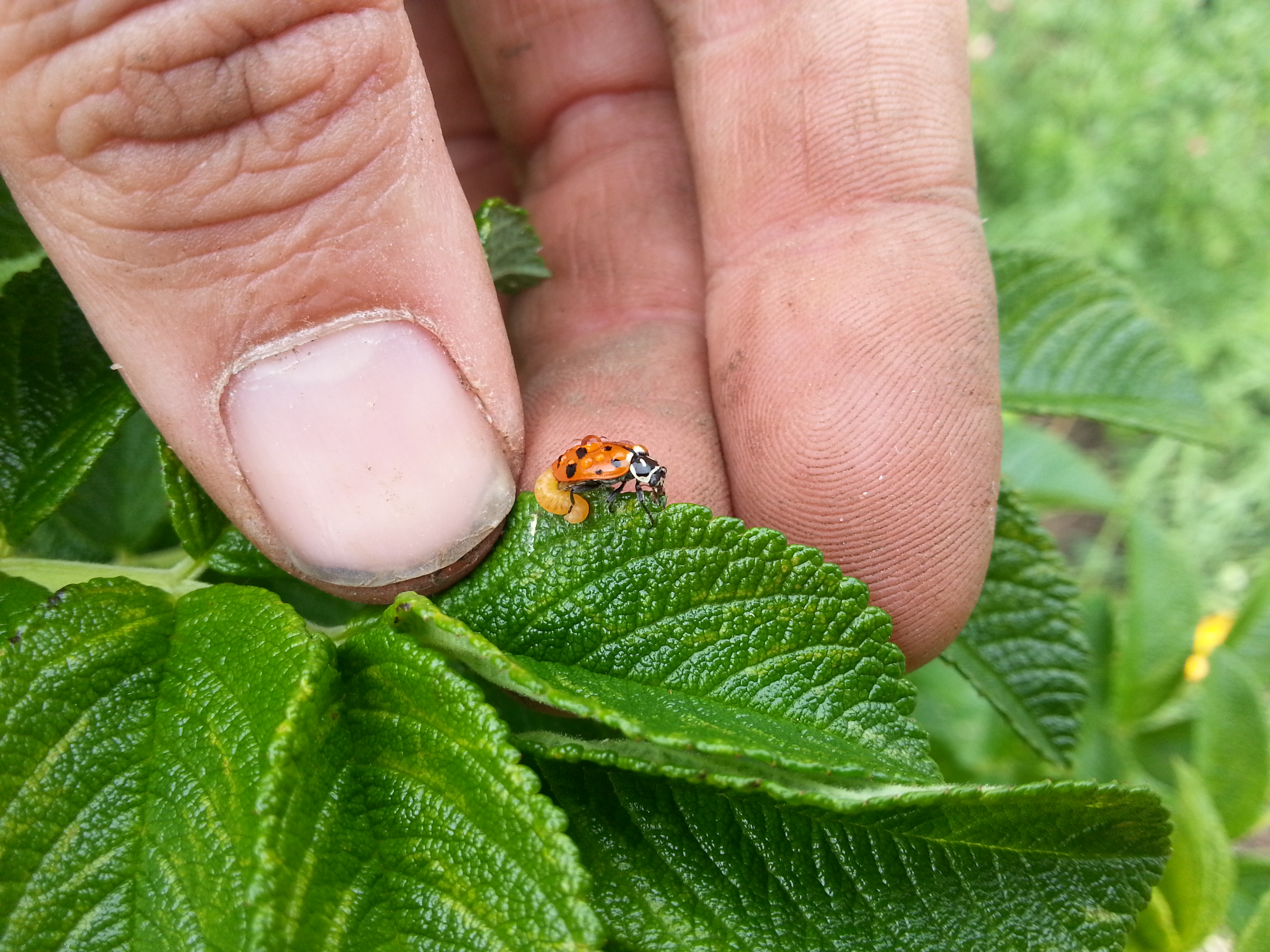
Dinocampus coccinellae larva exiting Ladybird

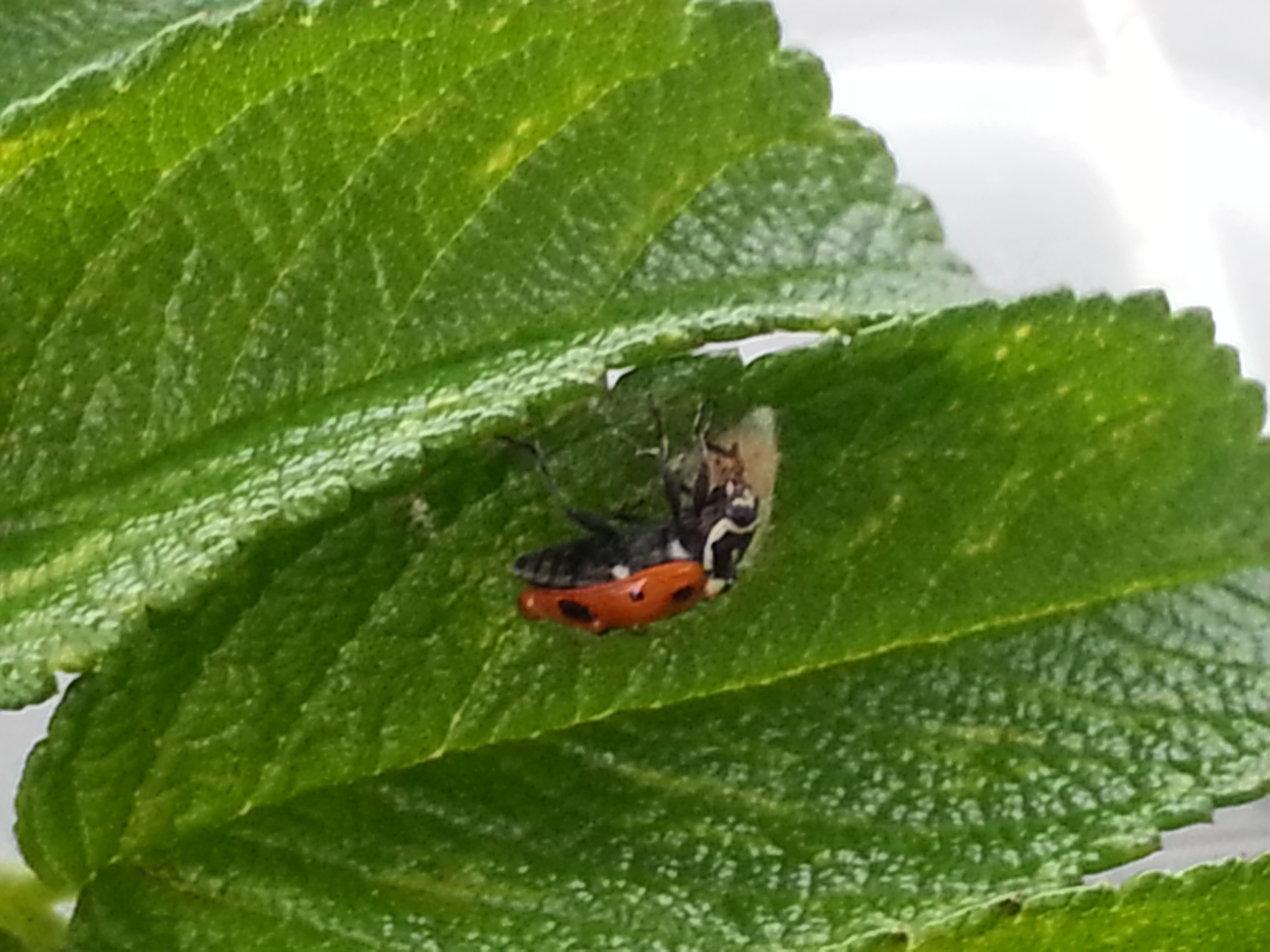
Dinocampus coccinellae larva forming cocoon next to paralyzed ladybird

In 1802, Schrank first described a female adult of this species as "Lady-bird killer 2155. Deep black, eyes green; head, front legs, and apex of the petiolate abdomen mussel-brown." (A petiolate abdomen is one whose basal segment is stalk-like, that is, long and slender.) Nearly all D. coccinellae are female offspring of unfertilized eggs, although males are also occasionally found. The male, when observed, has no ovipositor and is slimmer and darker than females.

== Biology ==
The mature female wasp seeks out adult female ladybirds, although they will sometimes oviposit into a male adult or larval instar. One egg is planted in the host's soft underbelly. The wasp larva hatches after 5–7 days into a first instar larva with large mandibles and proceeds to remove any other eggs or larvae before beginning to feed on the ladybird's fat bodies and gonads.

The wasp larva inside the ladybird goes through four larval instars in 18–27 days. Meanwhile, the ladybird continues to forage and feed until the wasp larva, when it is ready to emerge, paralyzes the ladybird before tunneling out. It pupates in a cocoon attached to the leg of the living ladybird, whose brightly colored body and occasional twitching reduce predation. A growing D. coccinellae wasp nestled in its cocoon is extremely vulnerable, and other insects will devour it. If one of these predators tries to eat it, the ladybird retaliates, scaring it off. The ladybird becomes the parasite's bodyguard, by protecting it from predators. However, wasp cocoons protected in this way develop into adults that produce fewer eggs, due to the energy demands of maintaining a living protector.

Ladybirds paralyzed, twitching, and attached to the cocoon of D. coccinellae have been compared to zombies by many writers. After 6–9 days, the wasp emerges from the cocoon. Remarkably, some 25% of ladybirds revive and emerge from paralysis once the cocoon has been emptied. The paralytic effect has been proposed to be associated with an RNA virus, Dinocampus coccinellae paralysis virus.

== Ecology ==
Dinocampus coccinellae can itself be parasitised by Gelis agilis, a hyperparasite that is known for its mimicry of ants. The wingless females of G. agilis oviposit into D. coccinellae cocoons; the egg immediately hatches and consumes the developing wasp. Cocoons hosting G. agilis usually take twice as long to emerge.

== Economic importance ==
Because one large aphidophagous ladybird can consume up to 5,500 aphids in a year, any ladybird parasite represents a potential threat to agriculture.
