= Ferdinand Rudow =

German entomologist (1840–1920)

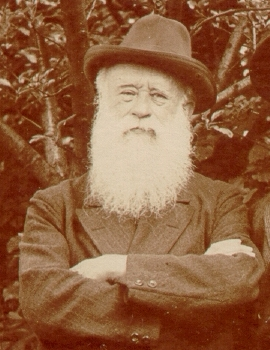
- Born: 2 April 1840; Eckartsberga, Principality of Anhalt
- Died: 3 September 1920 (aged 80); Naumburg, Germany
- Education: Leipzig University
- Scientific career
- Fields: Entomology; Taxonomy
- Thesis: Beitrag zur Kenntniss der Mallophagen oder Pelzfresser. Neue exotische Arten der Familie Philopterus (1869)

Ferdinand Rudow (2 April 1840 – 3 September 1920) was a German entomologist best known for the poor quality of his taxonomic work. He described over 200 species of wasps during his lifetime, almost all of which have been revised as synonyms of other species.

== Biography ==
Rudow was born in the town of Eckartsberga, in what is now Germany. His father was a merchant. Rudow began working as a teacher in 1865. He was granted his doctorate in 1869 by Leipzig University with a thesis on mallophaga, or chewing lice. By 1876 he was a senior teacher, later a professor, at a Gymnasium (a type of secondary school) in the German city of Perleberg. He retired from teaching in 1906, although he continued to publish. He died in Naumburg in 1920.

== Taxonomic work ==
After an initial interest in studying lice and mites, Rudow began to focus on wasps in 1871. Over the course of his research, he described 234 species and varieties within the Ichneumonidae family of parasitoid wasps, eventually amassing a collection of close to 14,000 insect specimens. Rudow donated the collection to the Phyletisches Museum of Jena personally in 1919. Numerous specimens in the collection were improperly stored, poorly identified, or damaged, although due to poor documentation it is impossible to say how much was received in poor condition and how much damage was caused by later poor storage.

His work was heavily criticised as unscientific by his contemporaries. Richard Ritter von Stein denounced the poor quality of his publications as early as 1884. Rudow was aware of the criticism, and may have begun to withdraw from the scientific community as a result. He refused to accept modern systems of nomenclature, and often wrote critically of them. In 1908, for example, he wrote that he was "disgusted by the activities of the so-called 'systematics'," whose changes he felt were confusing and unhelpful.

He was known for describing the same species more than once, or calling different species by the same name in a single paper. He also described already-known species as new, likely by accident. His early publications, until approximately 1888, were comparatively detailed, but the descriptions in his later work were often so vague or inaccurate that comparisons of described species or identification by specimen was not possible. Basic information such as the location where specimens were found, their habitats, and their preferred hosts was generally either full of errors or not included at all.

The species he described have been extensively revised by subsequent entomologists, including English entomologist John Frederick Perkins in the 1930s and J. Oehlke in the 1960s, and most of them are now considered synonyms of other species. In a 1993 article which presented a revision of 167 species described by Rudow, German entomologist Klaus Horstmann described him as "undoubtedly the most incompetent" taxonomist of Ichneumonidae. Only eleven of the species names examined in the article were retained as valid names. Later that same year, Horstmann and Martin Schwarz published a revision of 67 species described by Rudow in the wasp genera Pezolochus and Pezomachus between 1914 and 1917; only two, Pezomachus haemorhoidalis and Pezomachus rificeps were retained. (Note: As of 2024, these genera – not described by Rudow in the first place – are both considered synonyms of Gelis.)

== Bibliography ==
- Horstmann, Klaus (19 April 1993). "Revision der von Ferdinand Rudow beschriebenen Ichneumonidae I. (Hymenoptera)". Beiträge zur Entomologie = Contributions to Entomology (in German). 43 (1): 3–38. doi:10.21248/contrib.entomol.43.1.3-38. ISSN 2511-6428 – via Zobodat.
- Krogmann, Lars; Von Knorre, Dietrich; Beutel, Rolf G. (December 2007). "Die Chalcidoidea-Sammlung von Ferdinand Rudow (1840–1920) im Phyletischen Museum (Jena)". Mitteilungen aus dem Hamburgischen Zoologischen Museum und Institut: 129–140 – via ResearchGate.
- Schwarz, Martin; Horstmann, Klaus (18 June 1993). "Revision der von Ferdinand RUDOW beschriebenen Ichneumonidae II: Pezolochus FÖRSTER und Pezomachus GRAVENHORST (Hymenoptera)". Beiträge zur Entomologie (in German). 43 (2): 417–430. doi:10.21248/contrib.entomol.43.2.417-430. ISSN 0005-805X – via Zobodat.
- Vidal, Stefan (January 2005). "The history of Hymenopteran parasitoid research in Germany". Biological Control. 32 (1): 25–33. Bibcode:2005BiolC..32...25V. doi:10.1016/j.biocontrol.2004.09.017. ISSN 1049-9644.
