= Slow bee paralysis virus =

Virus classification
- (unranked): Virus
- Realm: Riboviria
- Kingdom: Orthornavirae
- Phylum: Pisuviricota
- Class: Pisoniviricetes
- Order: Picornavirales
- Family: Iflaviridae
- Genus: Iflavirus
- Species: Iflavirus apistardum

Species of virus

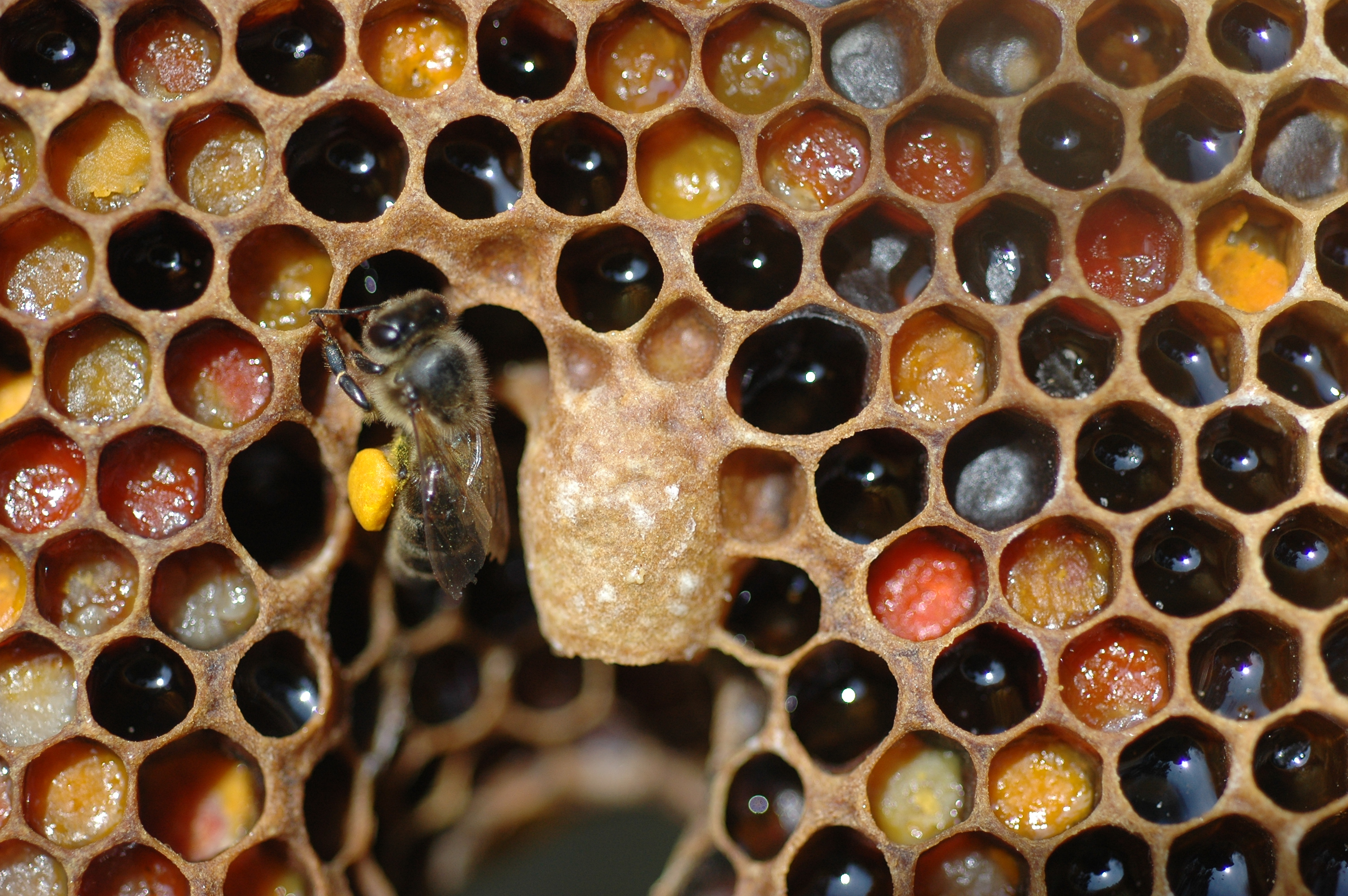
The virus infects bees through mites that live in their colonies.

Slow bee paralysis virus (SBPV) is a virus discovered in England in 1974 that infects honeybees (Apis mellifera), bumblebees (Bombus spp.), and silkworms (Bombyx mori) through Varroa destructor mite infestations. The virus causes paralysis in the front two pairs of legs of adult bees eventually killing its hosts. The virus is in the iflaviridae family of viruses. Infection by iflaviridae viruses is among the leading cause of death of honeybee colonies. As bees and silkworms are of great economic and biological importance, the virus is the subject of ongoing research.

== Structure ==
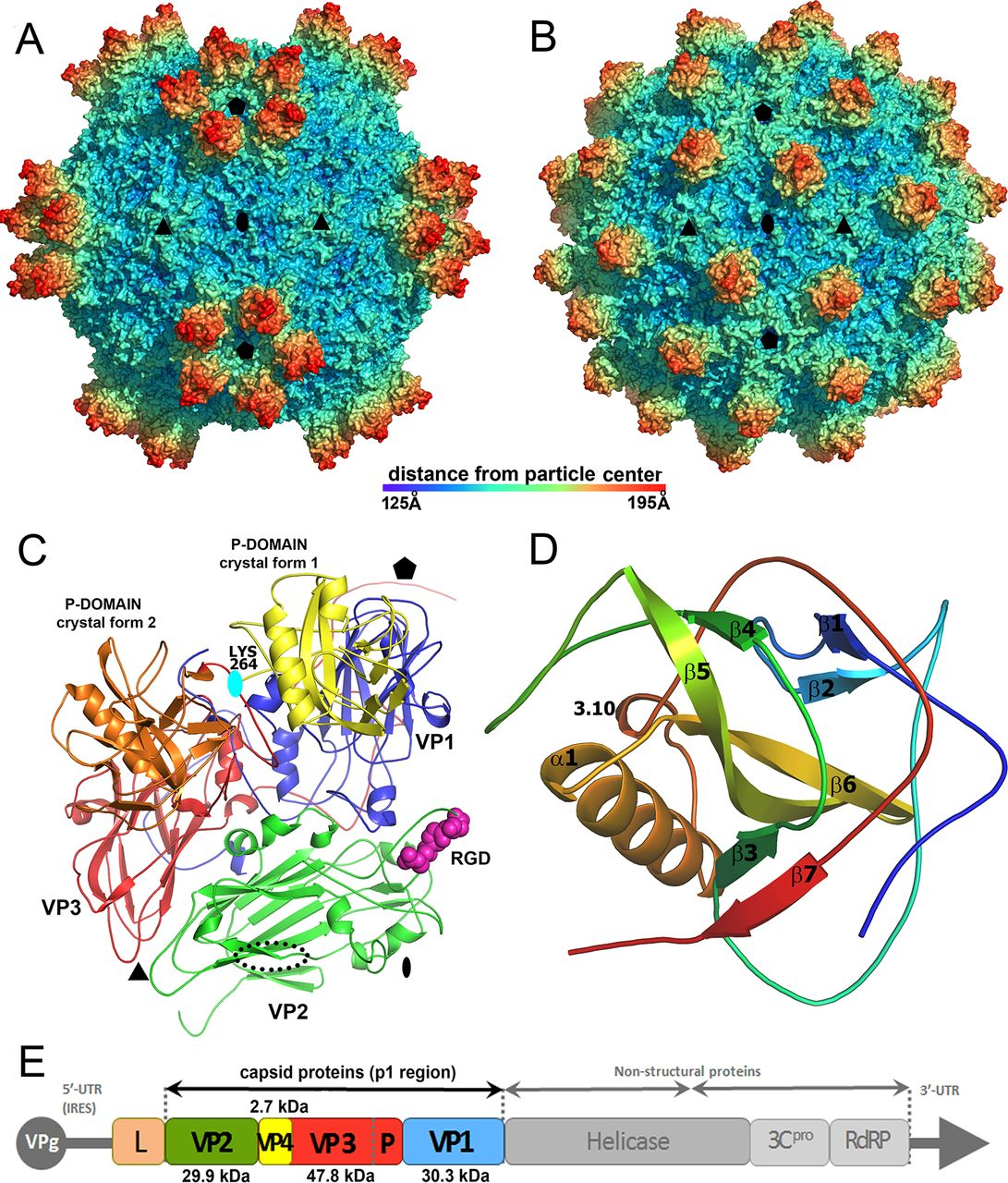
Structure of Slow bee paralysis virus (SBPV) virion and the icosahedral asymmetric unit.

The virus has an "... icosahedral capsid formed from sixty copies of three proteins which are common to picornaviruses." These proteins are 46, 27, and 29 kilodaltons. One of these three proteins (VP3) has a C-terminal globular domain which folds to create a single globular protein P domain. The position of this protruding protein is such that it may easily encounter and interact with the bee host cells. Because of this, it is believed the protruding protein may act as a receptor. This receptor activity has been known to occur in many plant viruses, but has not yet been seen in this order.

== Genome ==
SBPV is a non-enveloped Positive-sense single-stranded RNA virus, and is 9470 nucleotides long. The virus has approximately 300 nucleotides of 5' untranslated region and approximately 270 nucleotides of 3' untranslated region and is terminated by a poly(A) tail. The RNA has a coding region which codes for RNA-dependent RNA polymerase. Though it was not identified, it is expected that a viral genome-linked protein, involved in stability, replication, and translation, would be bound to the 5' end. There are two strains of the virus, named "Rothamsted" and "Harpenden" which are 83% identical at the nucleotide level, and 94% identical at the amino acid level.

== Replication cycle ==
=== Entry ===
Though little is known about the genome release mechanism, it has been hypothesized that low pH may promotes SBPV genome release, and the virus may enter host cells through endosomes. This would suggest that the virus effectively circumvents the host cells' cap-dependent translation. Furthermore, it has been previously shown that picornaviruses enter the host cell membrane through the use of liposomes, however, SBPV is not myristoylated. It is possible, then, that SBPV enters the cell membrane through "...residues 4–21 of VP4 of SBPV [which] form an amphipathic α-helix in which the polar and hydrophobic residues are segregated to the opposite sides." On the other hand, it is not clear if VP4 contributes to virus cell entry at all, since the electron density of VP4 could not be identified in the slow bee paralysis virus.

=== Transmission, infection, and diagnosis ===
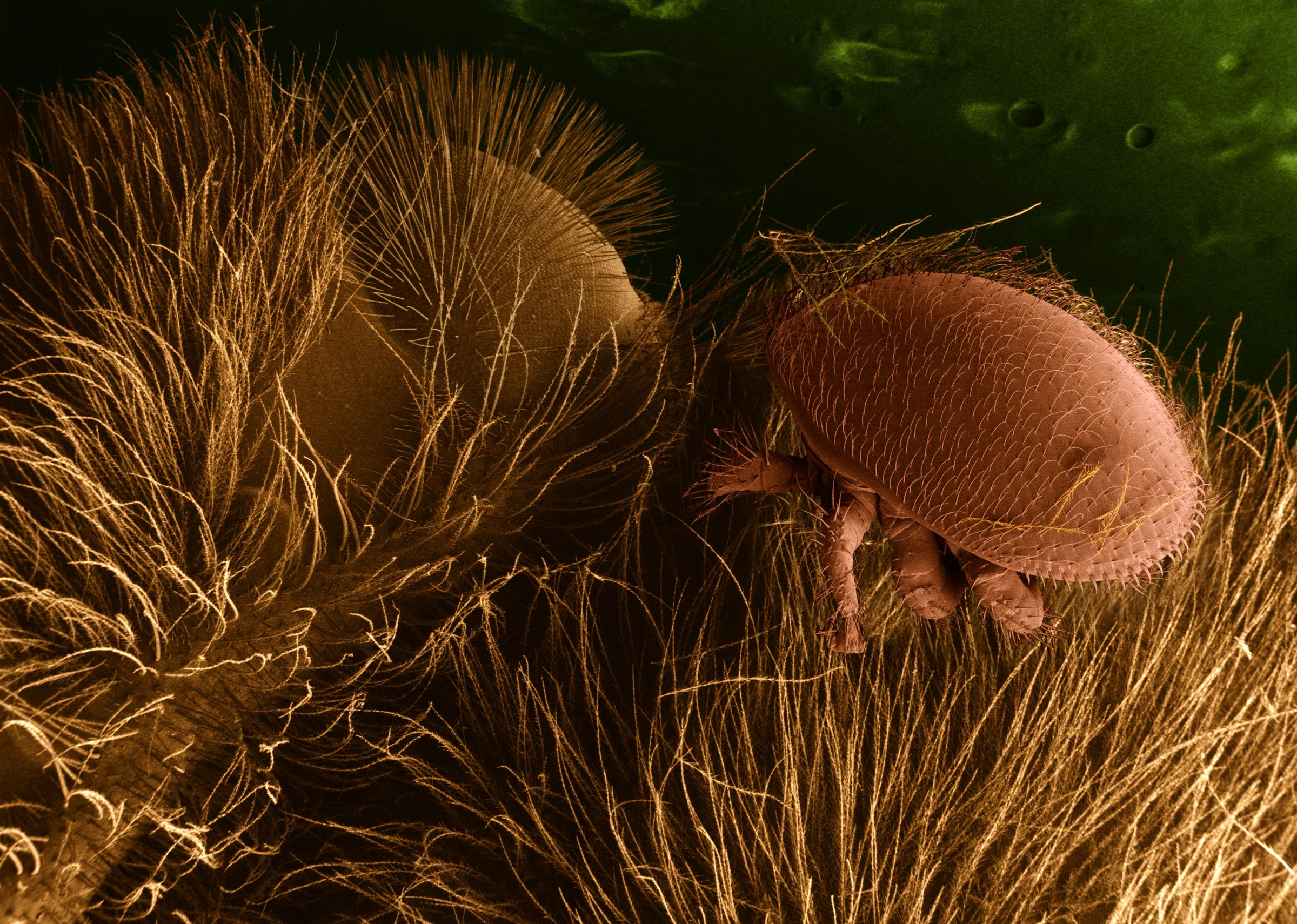
Varroa destructor on honeybee host

SBPV is transmitted by the common honeybee parasite, the Varroa destructor mite. It is transmitted directly to adults and pupae when the mite feeds upon and infects the bee's hemolymph. The virus accumulates mainly in the head, salivary glands, and fatty tissues of the bee; it accumulates to a much lesser degree in the hindlegs, midgut, and rectum. Because of this, the virus may also be spread through oral transmission between bees.

Many viruses that plague bees are found living within the Varroa mite, and many, like SBPV, can be directly transmitted to the bee by the mites themselves. As the name suggests, slow bee paralysis virus induces paralysis to the anterior legs ten to twelve days after infection.

=== Management ===
The virus has a low natural prevalence across large parts of Europe, but can be propagated in bee colonies with varying levels of Varroa infestations.

Management of SBPV can be effectively achieved through management of the Varroa destructor mite. Management strategies include:

- Mechanical control such as bee dusting
- Using mite-tolerant bee strains
- Chemical control with bio and synthetic pesticides
