= Flacherie =

Disease of silkworms

Flacherie (literally: "flaccidness") is a disease of silkworms, caused by silkworms eating infected or contaminated mulberry leaves. Flacherie infected silkworms look weak and can die from this disease. Silkworm larvae that are about to die from flacherie are a dark brown.

There are two kinds of flacherie: essentially, infectious (viral) flacherie and noninfectious (touffée) flacherie. Both are technically a lethal diarrhea.

Touffée flacherie is caused by heat waves.

Viral flacherie is ultimately caused by infection with Bombyx mori infectious flacherie virus (BmIFV, Iflaviridae), Bombyx mori densovirus (BmDNV, Parvoviridae) or Bombyx mori cypovirus 1 (BmCPV-1, Reoviridae). This either alone or in combination with bacterial infection destroys the gut tissue. Bacterial pathogens contributing to infectious flacherie are Serratia marcescens, and species of Streptococcus and Staphylococcus in the form known as thatte roga.

In the nineteenth century, flacherie resisted the efforts of Louis Pasteur.
