= Eckartsberga =

- Town
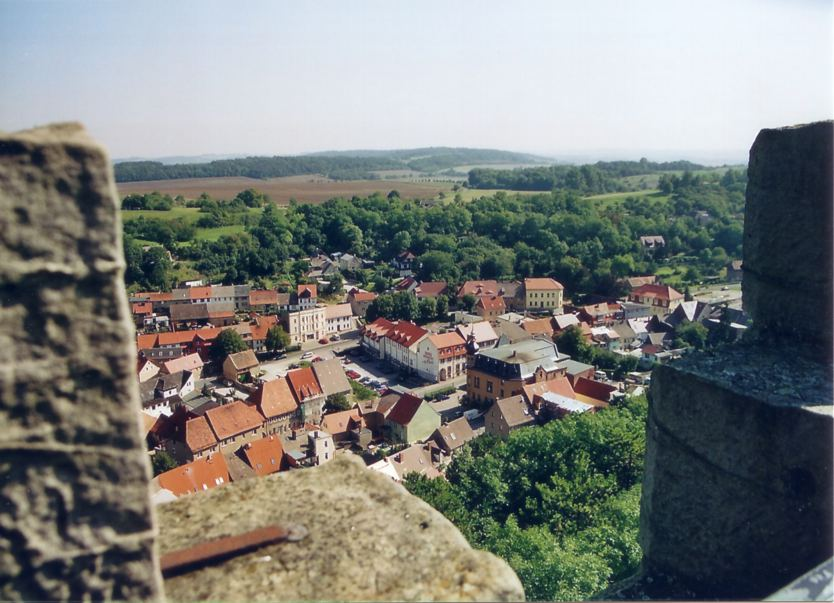

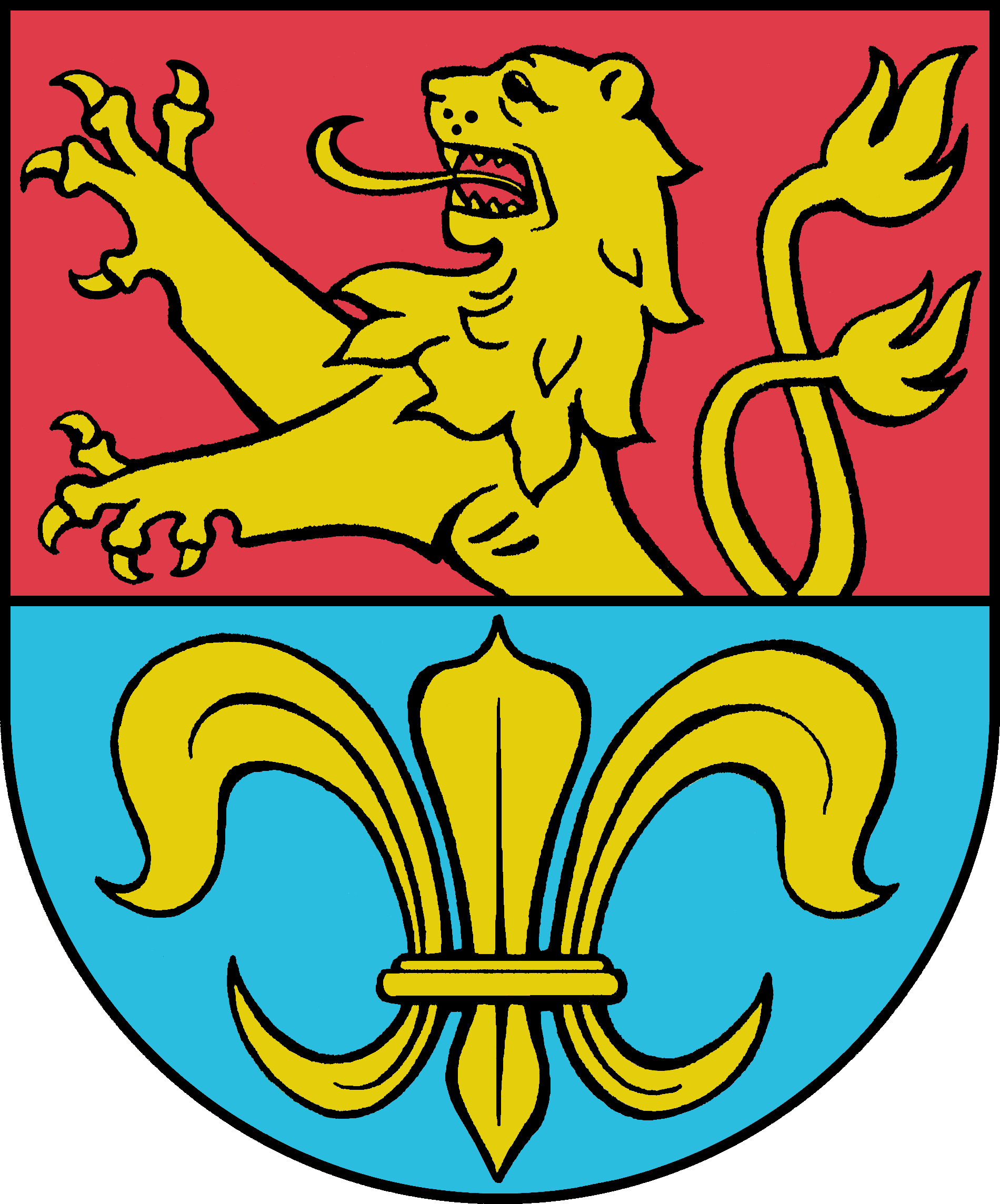
- Coat of arms

- Location of Eckartsberga within Burgenlandkreis district
- Interactive map of Eckartsberga
- Location within Germany Location within Saxony-Anhalt
- Coordinates: 51°07′N 11°33′E
- Country: Germany
- State: Saxony-Anhalt
- District: Burgenlandkreis
- Municipal assoc.: An der Finne

Government
  - Mayor (2023–30): Marlis Vogel (CDU)

Area
  - Total: 35.97 km^{2} (13.89 sq mi)
- Elevation: 243 m (797 ft)

Population (2025-12-31)
  - Total: 2,232
  - Density: 62.05/km^{2} (160.7/sq mi)
- Time zone: UTC+01:00 (CET)
  - Summer (DST): UTC+02:00 (CEST)
- Postal codes: 06648
- Dialling codes: 034467
- Vehicle registration: BLK
- Website: www.vgem-finne.de

Eckartsberga (German pronunciation: [ˌɛkaʁtsˈbɛʁɡaː]) is a town in the Burgenlandkreis district of Saxony-Anhalt, Germany. It is situated west of Naumburg. It is part of the Verbandsgemeinde ("collective municipality") An der Finne. Since 2009 it has included the former municipalities of Burgholzhausen and Tromsdorf.

== People ==
- Ludwig Abel (1835-1895), violinist and composer
- Klaus Agthe (born 1930), businessman and author
- Peter Frenkel (born 1939), athlete
- Rolf Friedemann Pauls (1915-2002), diplomat
- Ferdinand Rudow (1840-1920), entomologist
