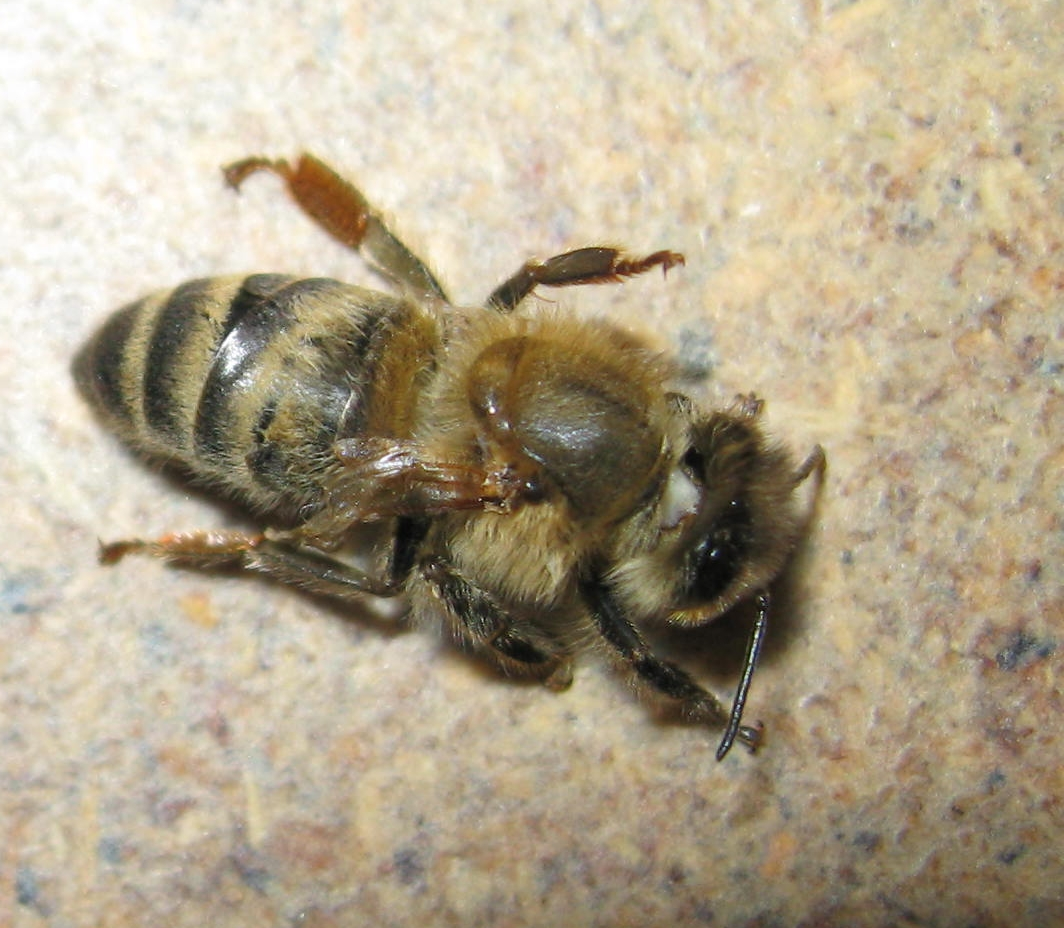
- Carniolan honey bee with DWV

Virus classification
- (unranked): Virus
- Realm: Riboviria
- Kingdom: Orthornavirae
- Phylum: Pisuviricota
- Class: Pisoniviricetes
- Order: Picornavirales
- Family: Iflaviridae
- Genus: Iflavirus
- Species: Iflavirus aladeformis

= Deformed wing virus =

Species of virus

Deformed wing virus (DWV) is a positive-strand RNA virus, one of 22 known viruses affecting honey bees. While most commonly infecting the honey bee, Apis mellifera, it has also been documented in other bee species, like Bombus terrestris, thus, indicating it may have a wider host specificity than previously anticipated. The virus was first isolated from a sample of symptomatic honeybees from Japan in the early 1980s and is currently distributed worldwide. It is found also in pollen baskets and commercially reared bumblebees. Its main vector in A. mellifera is the Varroa mite, which feeds on the hemolymph of the bee. It is named after what is usually the most obvious deformity it induces in the development of a honeybee pupa, which is shrunken and deformed wings, but other developmental deformities are often present. There are three known variants of Deformed Wing Virus, DWV-A, DWV-B, and DWV-C, of which the first two are vectored by the Varroa destructor mite.

== Genomics ==
The viral genome was published in 2006. The genome is 10140 nucleotides in length excluding the poly(A) tail and contains a single large open reading frame encoding a 328-kilo Dalton (kDA) polyprotein. 5' of the central coding sequence is a 1144-nucleotide nontranslated leader sequence (UTR). 3' coding sequence is a 317-nucleotide nontranslated region which is followed by a poly(A) tail.

The genome is 29.5% adenosine, 15.8% cytosine, 22.4% guanine and 32.3% uracil. Analysis of codon use found 39.5% uracil and 26.8% adenosine in the third base position. There are three major structural proteins – VP1 (44 kDa), VP2 (32 kDa), and VP3 (28 kDa). These lie in the N-terminal section of the polyprotein. The C-terminal part of the polyprotein contains sequence motifs typical of well-characterized picornavirus nonstructural proteins: an RNA helicase, a chymotrypsin-like 3C protease and an RNA-dependent RNA polymerase.

VP1 is encoded between codons 486 to 880 and VP3 lies between codons 913 and 1063. The boundaries of VP2 are not as well defined but it is encoded 5' of VP1. There may be a small protein (VP4) encoded between codons 464 and 486 but this protein has not been confirmed to be present in the genome.

Lying 5' to VP2 is a very variable leader peptide (L protein). Despite occupying 7.3% of the polyprotein it is responsible for 26.2% to 33.3% of the variation found between the Iflaviridae. It may be involved in the inhibition of host cap-dependent mRNA translation and stimulation of viral internal ribosome entry site activity.

VPg, a small protein (23 amino acids) common to many RNA viruses, is responsible for stabilizing the 5' end of the genomic RNA for replication and translation. A putative VPg is present between nucleotide positions 2093 and 2118 immediately 5' of the 3C protease. The protein itself has not yet been confirmed to be present in the viron.

The helicase domains A, B and C are found between codons 1460 and 1575. The 3C protease domains span codons 2183 to 2327. The usual eight RdRp domains are located between codons 2493 and 2828.

The genome structure is

5'UTR-L-VP2-(VP4)-VP1-VP3-RNA helicase-(VPg)-3C protease-RNA dependent RNA polymerase-3'UTR

The putative VP4 and VPg proteins are marked here by parentheses. If the VPg is present in the genome a copy will be bound to the 5' end of the RNA genome.

== Molecular biology ==
The virion is a 30-nm icosahedral particle consisting of the single positive-stranded RNA genome and three major structural proteins.

== Virology ==
The virus is concentrated in the heads and abdomens of infected adult bees with significantly reduced titres in the thorax. The genome is detectable by reverse transcriptase-polymerase chain reaction in the head, thorax, abdomen and wings of infected bees. Only the legs are devoid of virus.

== Symptoms ==
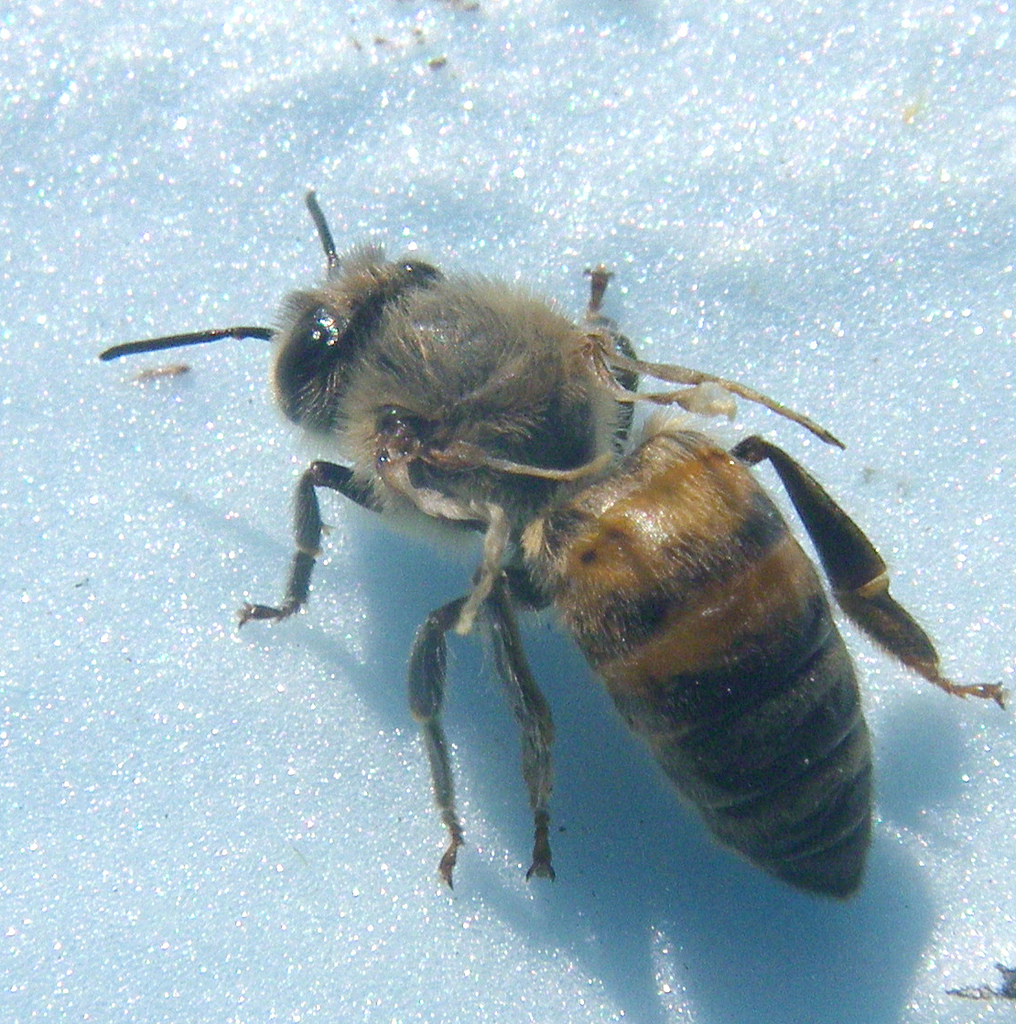
Honey bee with deformed wings

Deformed wing virus (DWV) is suspected of causing the wing and abdominal deformities often found on adult honeybees in colonies infested with Varroa mites. These symptoms include damaged appendages, particularly stubby, useless wings, shortened, rounded abdomens, miscoloring and paralysis of the legs and wings. The wing deformities result in bees that are unable to fly. Symptomatic bees have severely reduced life-span (less than 48 hours usually) and are typically expelled from the hive. The symptoms are strongly correlated with elevated DWV titres, with reduced titres in asymptomatic bees from the same colonies. In the absence of mites the virus is thought to persist in the bee populations as a covert infection, transmitted orally between adults (nurse bees) since the virus can be detected in hypopharyngeal secretions (royal jelly) and broodfood and also vertically through the queen's ovaries and through drone sperm. DWV-A cannot replicate in the Varroa mite, while DWV-B can replicate and thus infect the mite.

== Transmission by Varroa destructor ==
The severe symptoms of DWV infections appear to be associated with Varroa destructor infestation of the bee hive and studies have shown that Varroa destructor harbors greater levels of the virus than are found even in severely infected bees. Thus V. destructor may not only be a concentrating vector of the virus but may also act as a replicating incubator, magnifying and increasing its effects on the bees and on the hive. The Varroa mite has been demonstrated to cause the frequency of deformed wing virus to increase in frequency from 10 percent to 100 percent. It is the single greatest factor in the decimation of bee colonies worldwide. The DWV-B strain of this virus has been shown to be particularly virulent and responsible of over-winter colony mortality. In temperate regions, adult honey bee workers remain in the hive surrounding the queen until the following spring. During this relatively long period of several months, viral load may increase in each worker to a lethal level. If too many workers die from DWV infection during winter, the colony will not be able to stabilize the temperature of the hive and the whole colony may collapse.

The combination of mites and DWV may cause immunosuppression in the bees and increased susceptibility to other opportunistic pathogens and has been considered a significant factor in honey bee colony collapse disorder.

The virus may also be transmitted from queen to egg and in regurgitated food sources, but in the absence of V. destructor this does not typically result in large numbers of deformed bees.

== DWV impairs cognitive functions ==
The artificial infection of this virus is also reported to cause specific deficits in behavioural plasticity of honeybees. Honeybees are more responsive to sucrose stimuli four days after infection. Furthermore, infected bees show impairment in an associative learning paradigm during acquisition and in the test for memory retention 2h and 24 hours after the training. Performance in non-associative learning paradigms, like habituation and sensitization, was not affected by the virus.

== Kakugo virus and aggressive behavior ==
Another virus, the Kakugo virus, has an RNA sequence that is 98% similar to DWV. It is considered a subtype of the DWV species. It is found only in the mushroom bodies of aggressive, guard honeybees. Bees that are significantly affected by DWV also have measurable titers of the virus in their heads while bees that are symptomless only produce titers in their abdomens or thoraxes.
