= Burgholzhausen =

- Stadtteil of Eckartsberga
- Interactive map of Burgholzhausen
- Location within Germany Location within Saxony-Anhalt
- Coordinates: 51°8′N 11°31′E
- Country: Germany
- State: Saxony-Anhalt
- District: Burgenlandkreis
- Town: Eckartsberga

Area
  - Total: 6.69 km^{2} (2.58 sq mi)
- Elevation: 244 m (801 ft)

Population (2006-12-31)
  - Total: 288
  - Density: 43.0/km^{2} (111/sq mi)
- Time zone: UTC+01:00 (CET)
  - Summer (DST): UTC+02:00 (CEST)
- Postal codes: 06648
- Dialling codes: 034467

Burgholzhausen (German pronunciation: [ˌbʊʁkhɔltsˈhaʊzn̩]) is a village and a former municipality in the Burgenlandkreis district, in Saxony-Anhalt, Germany. Since 1 July 2009, it is part of the town Eckartsberga.
