= Sacbrood virus =

Virus classification
- (unranked): Virus
- Realm: Riboviria
- Kingdom: Orthornavirae
- Phylum: Pisuviricota
- Class: Pisoniviricetes
- Order: Picornavirales
- Family: Iflaviridae
- Genus: Iflavirus
- Species: Iflavirus sacbroodi

Species of virus

Sacbrood virus or SBV disease is an infectious disease caused by the Morator aetatulas virus, which affects honey bee larvae. When infected, the colony declines gradually with few or no replacement workers, resulting in a loss of 20-80% of honey production.

== Reasons ==
SBV is caused by the M. aetatulas virus. Transmission occurs when bees care for infected larvae, enter colonies to steal honey (robbing), drift into the wrong hive (drifting), or through the actions of beekeepers (changing frames or combining hives).

According to Borchert, who studied the disease in 1966, one diseased larva could infect up to 3,000 healthy larvae. Bailey, in 1981, claimed that the liquid in a killed larva containing 1 mg of virus can infect all worker larvae in a population of 1,000 healthy bees.

== Symptoms ==
When infected bees go to work, particularly heavy hives, it is noticed that bees remove dead larvae from the nest. The screw cap on the pupal surface is sunken, and a few small pinholes may be present. The larvae die at the new stage screw cap (pupa). At the pointed tip of the diseased larva protruding between the nest holes, the tip of the larvae tilts towards the abdomen. At the larva's end is a small transparent water bag. Dead larvae emit no odor.

== Prevention and treatment ==
The best preventative measures are maintaining hygiene of equipment, transportation tools, and beekeeping materials when trading, importing, and transporting bees and related products. It is also important to inspect and interact with bees carefully. When importing new bee breeds, select healthy hives that are clean and disease free.

Antibiotics are ineffective against this disease. Biological management techniques include replacing the sick lord with a royal cap or silk thread, confining the hive for 8-10 days, removing bridges so that the bees thicken the remaining bridges, feeding 5-6 nights in a row to transfer to a new and better source of flowers and isolation from other bee farms and merging the weakening hive.

== See also ==
- Evolution of the Sacbrood Virus
