= Klaus Agthe =

German-born businessman and author

- Born: August 12, 1930 (age 96); Apolda, Germany
- Citizenship: German
- Education: Humboldt University of Berlin, Technische Universität Berlin, Indiana University
- Occupation: Businessman

Klaus Erich Agthe (born August 12, 1930, in Niederholzhausen, Province of Saxony, Prussia, Germany) is a German-born businessman and author.

== Childhood and education ==
Klaus Agthe grew up in Apolda in the province of Thuringia, Germany, went to school in Weimar and studied business administration at the Humboldt University in Berlin under Professor Konrad Mellerowicz. Agthe had not been admitted to the university but travelled to Berlin anyway and, without an appointment, introduced himself to Mellerowicz, who organized his matriculation, though he had never met Agthe before. In the course of his studies, he eventually followed Mellerowicz to Technische Universität Berlin where he received his doctorate in 1958 with the work "Die Abweichungen in der Plankostenrechnung." He was sponsored by Professor Mellerowicz.

In the interim, Agthe had spent a year studying at Indiana University in Bloomington, Indiana. The experiences and perceptions he gained during this time would shape his life significantly.

== Career ==
After finishing his studies, Agthe initially worked at Standard Elektrik Lorenz in Stuttgart, where he was mentored and significantly influenced by Harold Geneen, who was at that time the chief executive officer of SEL's parent company, ITT Corporation, In 1966 he moved to Braunschweig (Brunswick), Germany, to take up a position with the Schmalbach-Lubeca company, where he ascended to the Executive Board of the company. In 1976, following the acquisition of Schmalbach-Lubeca by the American Continental Can Company, Agthe moved to the United States to become a Vice President of Continental Can, with responsibility for operations in the Middle East, Africa and Asia.

In 1983 Agthe left CCC (which had been renamed to Continental Group) and moved to the U.S. subsidiary of Brown, Boveri & Cie. to become its chief executive officer, a post he retained after Brown Boveri's merger with ASEA, from which Asea Brown Boveri emerged. After ABB merged with Combustion Engineering, Agthe considered retirement, but, subsequent to German reunification, he was asked to represent ABB in its transactions with the Treuhandanstalt, the trust which had been set up by the German government to facilitate the reprivatization of the numerous enterprises formerly owned by East Germany. Agthe moved to Berlin and spent the next two years acquiring several former state owned companies.

In 1992, back in the United States, Agthe finished out his career as an independent consultant and a member of various boards. He was elected to the Board of Directors of Yellow Freight and VIAG North America, among others Since 2005, Agthe lives in retirement. He has been a citizen of the United States since 1984.

On 1 August 2020 Klaus Rehkugler will take over as Head of Sales & Marketing at Mercedes-Benz Vans and will answer personally to Marcus Breitschwerdt, Head of Mercedes-Benz Vans. He is currently the Head of Sales Operations and Communications for Europe Area at Mercedes-Benz Cars Rehkugler.

== Activity as an author ==
Agthe is the author and co-author of various books and articles about cost planning and business administration. One of his articles, published in the German Zeitung für Betriebswirtschaft in 1959, is considered groundbreaking in business circles.

In November 2008, Agthe published an autobiography entitled Shadows of War: A German Life in the Century of Extremes in the United States of America .

== Works ==
- Die Abweichungen in der Plankostenrechnung: Ihre Ermittlung, Analyse u. Verrechnung. Haufe, Freiburg i. Br., 1958
- "Stufenweise Fixkostendeckung im System des Direct Costing," Zeitschrift für Betriebswirtschaft, 29. Jg., 1959
- Kostenplanung und Kostenkontrolle im Industriebetrieb, Verlag für Unternehmensführung Gehlen, Baden Baden, 1963
- Konjunkturgerechte Unternehmenspolitik, Verlag für Unternehmensführung Gehlen, Baden Baden, 1969
- Strategie und Wachstum der Unternehmung: Praxis d. langfristigen Planung. Verlag für Unternehmensführung Gehlen, Baden-Baden, Bad Homburg (vor der Höhe), 1972
- From Communism to Capitalism – A Businessman's Diary of the Changes in East Germany, Indiana University International Business Forum, Bloomington, Indiana 1992, ASIN: B0006OYYW0
- Shadows of War: A German Life in the Century of Extremes. Booksurge Publishing, 2008, ISBN I-4196-9235-6, ISBN 978-1-4196-9235-2

== Awards ==
1978: election to the "Academy of Alumni Fellows" of the Kelley School of Business, Indiana University, Bloomington, Indiana, USA
