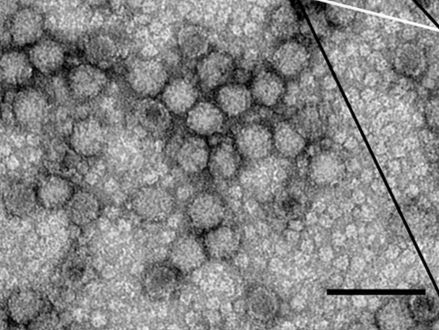
- TEM of deformed wing virus (DWV) virions bar line is 100 nm

Virus classification
- (unranked): Virus
- Realm: Riboviria
- Kingdom: Orthornavirae
- Phylum: Pisuviricota
- Class: Pisoniviricetes
- Order: Picornavirales
- Family: Iflaviridae
- Genus: Iflavirus

Species
- See text

= Iflaviridae =

Family of viruses

Iflaviridae is a family of positive sense RNA viruses insect-infecting viruses. Some of the insects commonly infected by iflaviruses include aphids, leafhoppers, flies, bees, ants, silkworms and wasps. The name "Ifla" is derived from the name "Infectious flacherie virus", a member species. There is one genus (Iflavirus) and 16 species in this family.

== Structure ==
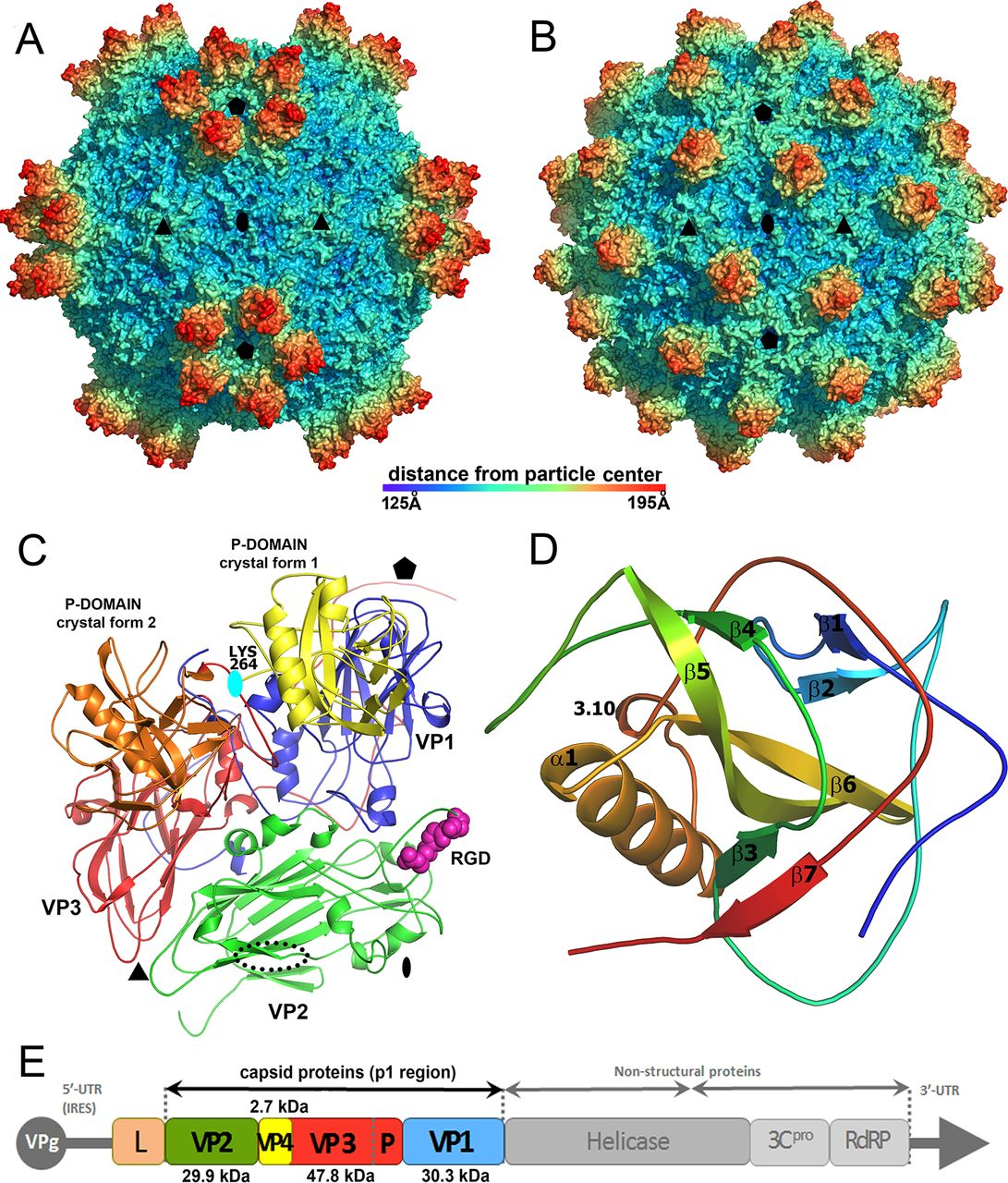
Structure of the family Iflaviridae slow bee paralysis virus (SBPV) virion and the icosahedral asymmetric unit. Genome map.

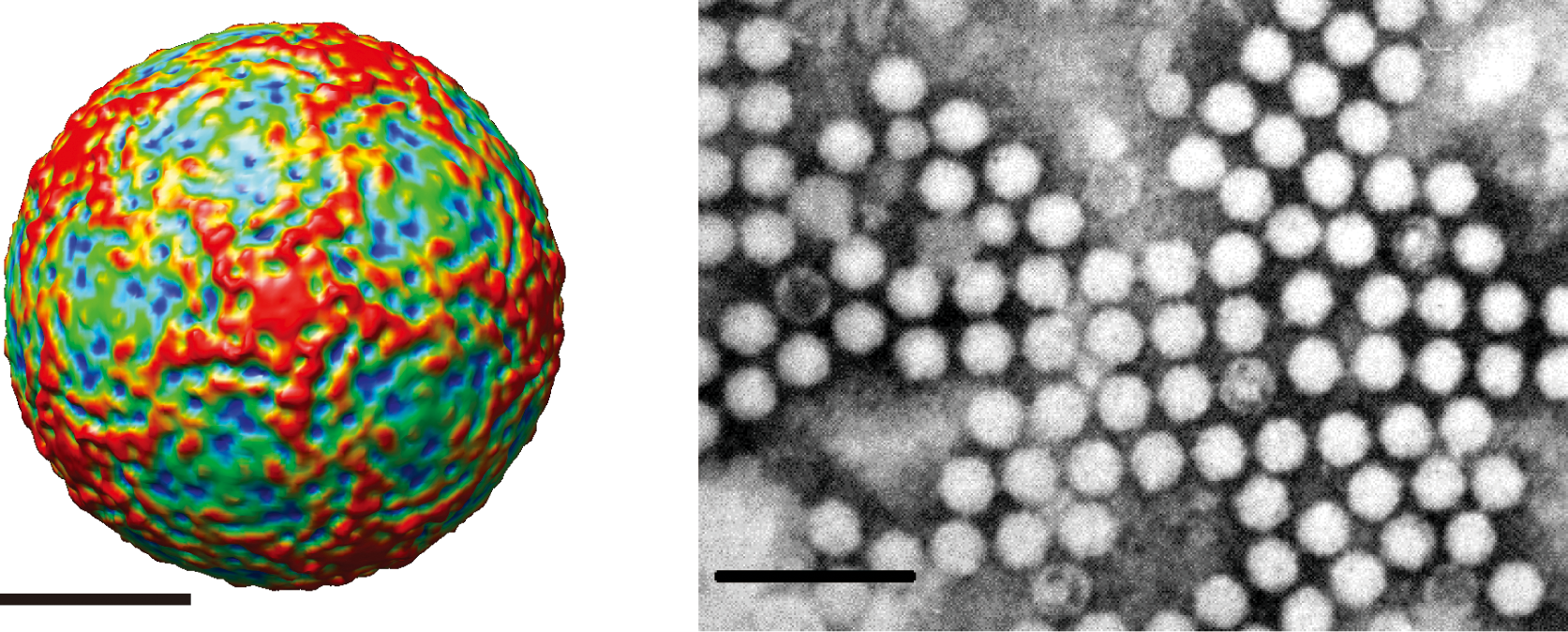
Structure of the family Iflaviridae infectious flacherie virus (IFV) virion and the icosahedral asymmetric unit.

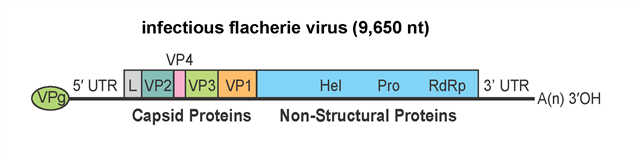
IFV genome map

Members of this family are insect-infecting viruses that consist of positive single-strand RNA genomes translated into a single polyprotein of ~3000 amino acids long. It encodes helicase, protease and RNA-dependent RNA polymerase enzymes and four structural proteins (VP1–4). The non-enveloped capsid has an icosahedral T=pseudo3 symmetry and is around 30 nm in diameter. VP1, VP2 and VP3 form the outer portion, with VP4 located internally. Genomes are linear and non-segmented, around 8.8-9.7kb in length.

== Life cycle ==
Viral replication is cytoplasmic. Entry into the host cell is achieved by attachment to host receptors, which mediates endocytosis. Replication follows the positive stranded RNA virus replication model. Positive stranded RNA virus transcription is the method of transcription. Translation takes place by ribosomal skipping. Insects serve as the natural host.

== Pathogenicity ==
Several viruses in this family are economically important because they are highly pathogenic to their honeybee and silkworm hosts, while others (including Dinocampus coccinellae paralysis virus, Nasonia vitripennis virus and Venturia canescens picorna-like virus) appear to cause little or no symptoms.

== Taxonomy ==
The family Iflaviridae contains one genus, Iflavirus, with the following 16 species, listed by scientific name and followed by the exemplar virus of the species:

- Iflavirus achedomestici, Acheta domesticus iflavirus
- Iflavirus aladeformis, Deformed wing virus
- Iflavirus apistardum, Slow bee paralysis virus
- Iflavirus betaspexiguae, Spodoptera exigua iflavirus 2
- Iflavirus brebrassicae, Brevicoryne brassicae virus
- Iflavirus dinococcinellae, Dinocampus coccinellae paralysis virus
- Iflavirus ectobliquae, Ectropis obliqua virus
- Iflavirus flacherie, Infectious flacherie virus
- Iflavirus lineacelli, Lymantria dispar iflavirus 1
- Iflavirus lylineolaris, Lygus lineolaris virus 1
- Iflavirus nilalugentis, Nilaparvata lugens honeydew virus 1
- Iflavirus pernudae, Perina nuda virus
- Iflavirus sacbroodi, Sacbrood virus
- Iflavirus spexiguae, Spodoptera exigua iflavirus 1
- Iflavirus vadestruente, Varroa destructor iflavirus 1
- Iflavirus vomitus, Antheraea pernyi iflavirus
