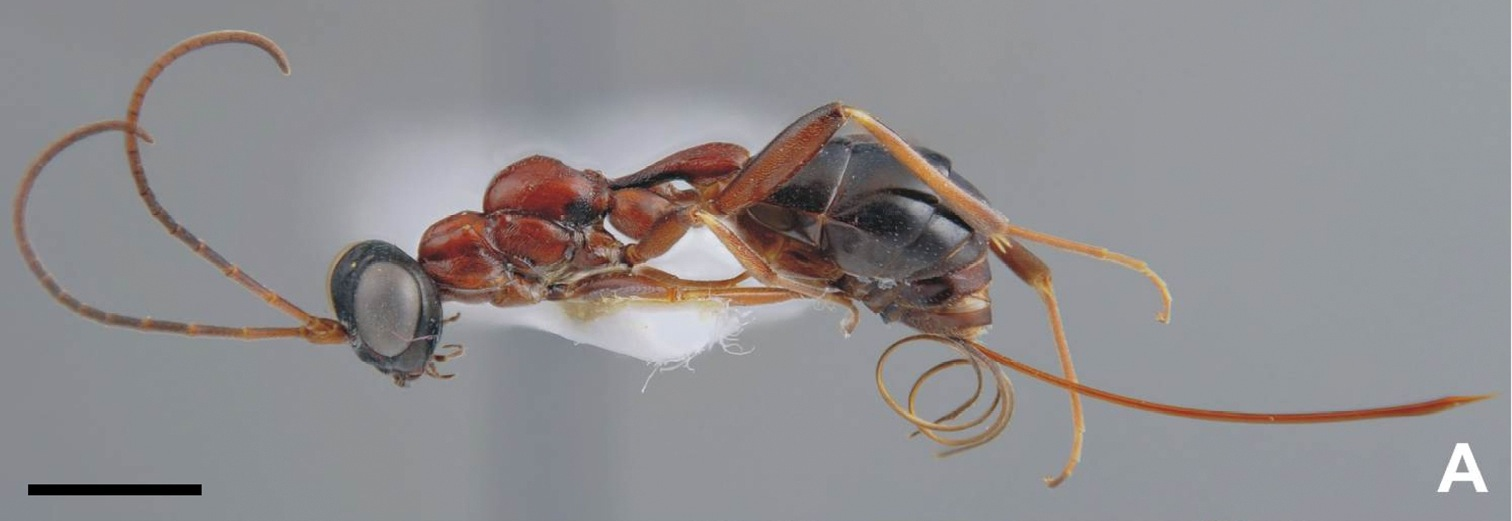

Scientific classification
- Kingdom: Animalia
- Phylum: Arthropoda
- Class: Insecta
- Order: Hymenoptera
- Family: Ichneumonidae
- Subfamily: Phygadeuontinae
- Tribe: Phygadeuontini
- Subtribe: Gelina
- Genus: Gelis; Thunberg, 1827

Type species
- Mutilla acarorum Linnaeus, 1758

Synonyms
- Blapsidotes Förster, 1869; Catalytus Förster, 1851; Hemimachus Ratzeburg, 1852; Pezolochus Förster, 1850; Pezomachus Gravenhorst, 1829

= Gelis =

Genus of wasps

Gelis is a genus of ichneumon wasps in the family Ichneumonidae. There are at least 270 described species in Gelis.

== See also ==
- List of Gelis species
