= Agriculture in California =

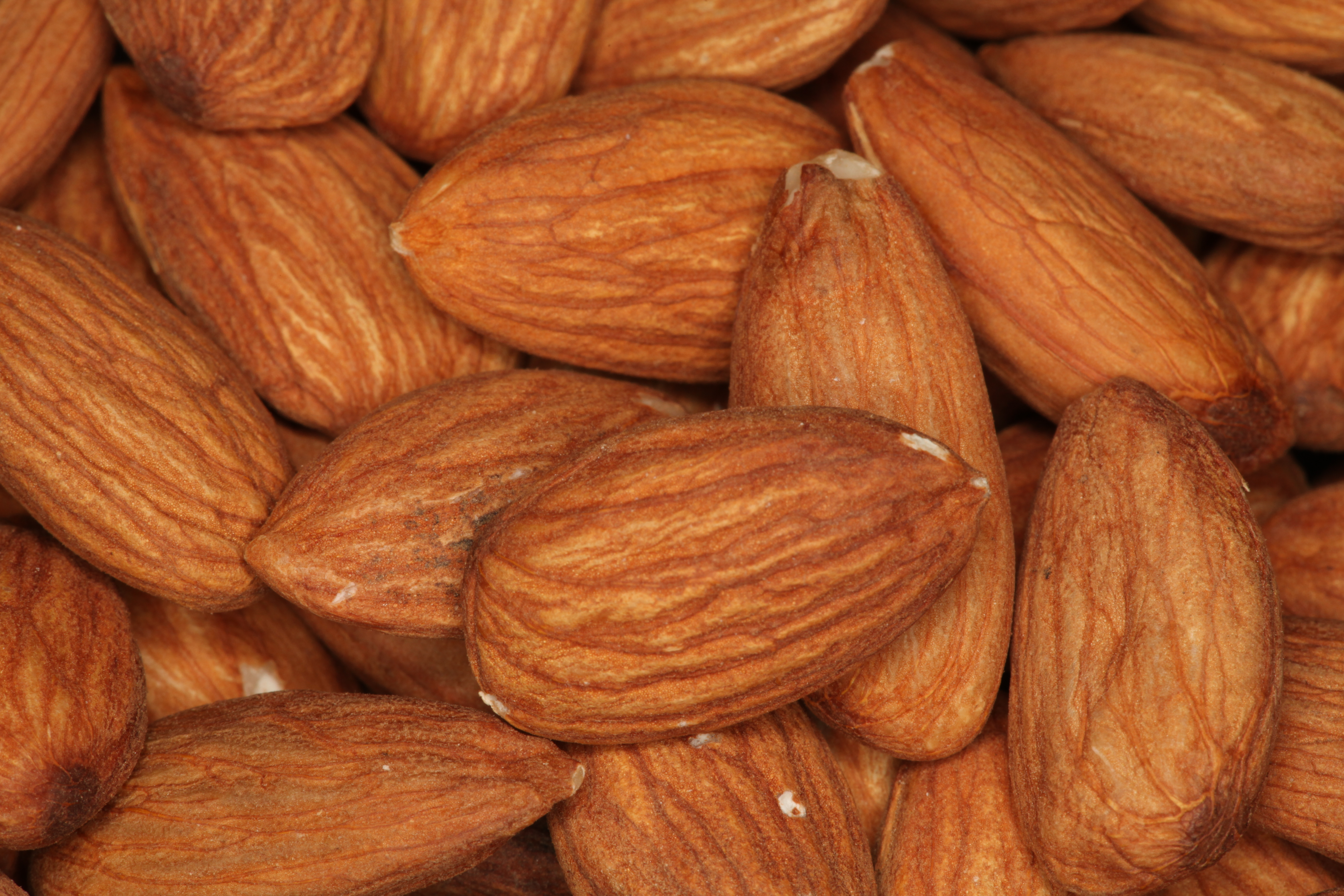
California produces almonds worth $5.3 billion every year. That is 100% of commercial almonds in the United States, 100% of all of North America, and 80% of commercial almonds around the world.

Agriculture is a significant sector in California's economy, producing nearly US$59.4 billion in revenue in 2023. There are more than 400 commodity crops grown across California, including a significant portion of all fruits, vegetables, and nuts in the United States. In 2017, there were 77,100 unique farms and ranches in the state, operating across 25.3 million acres (10,200,000 hectares) of land. The average farm size was 328 acres (133 ha), significantly less than the average farm size in the U.S. of 444 acres (180 ha).

Because of its scale, and the naturally arid climate, the agricultural sector uses about 40 percent of California's water consumption. The agricultural sector is also connected to other negative environmental and health impacts, including being one of the principal sources of water pollution.

== Value ==
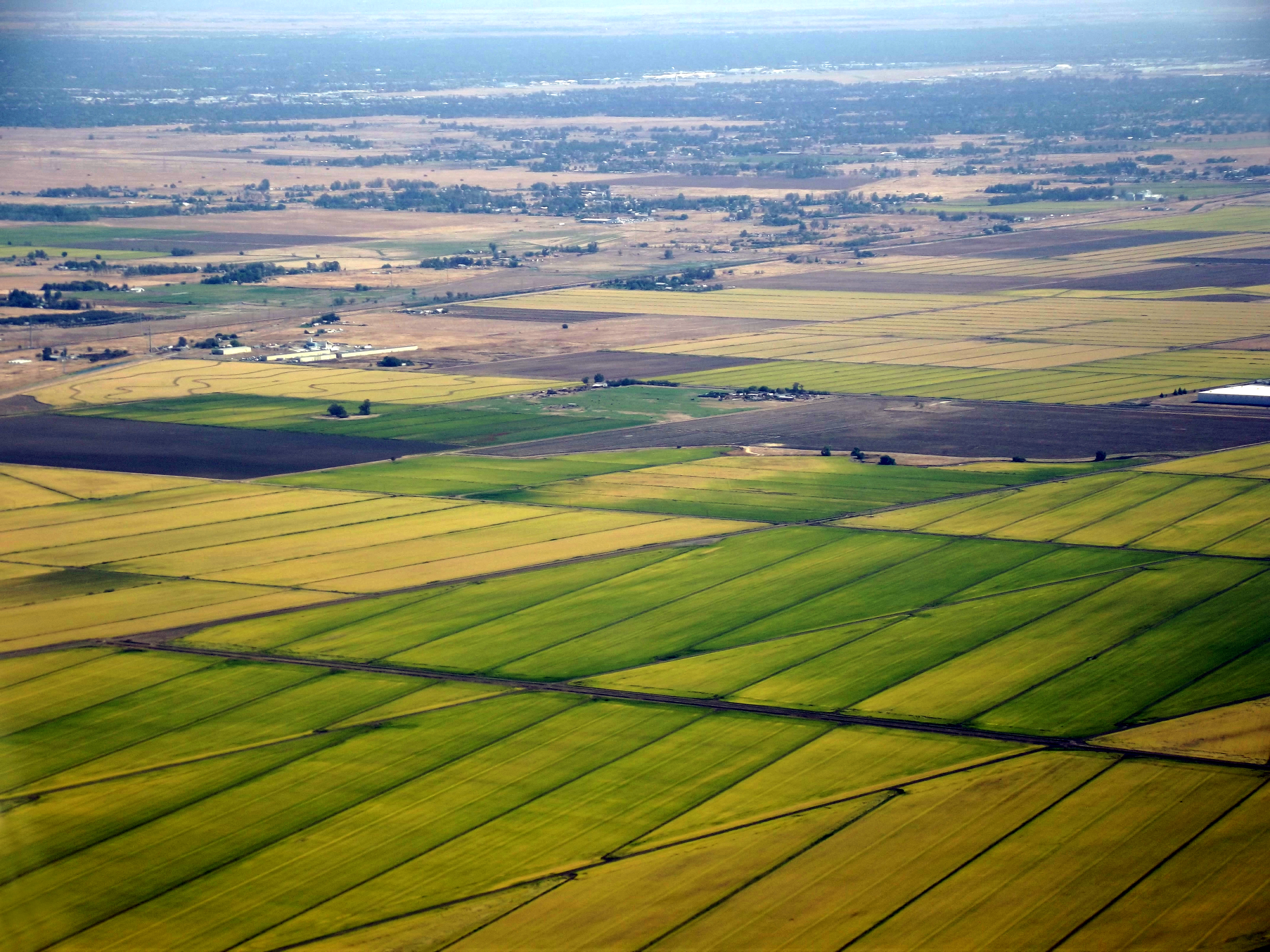
Rice paddies just north of Sacramento

The table below shows the top 21 commodities, by dollar value, produced in California in 2017. From 2016 to 2017, there was an increase of more than 2% in total value of the following agricultural products: almonds, dairy, grapes and cattle. The largest increase was seen in almond sales, which increased by 10.9% from 2016 to 2017, due to both increases in crop volume produced and the average market price for a pound of almonds. Dairy sales increased 8.2% from 2016 to 2017 due to an increase in the average price for milk, despite a slight decrease in total milk production. Grape sales increased by 3.1% from 2016 to 2017 due to an increase in price per ton of grape (from $832 per short ton ($917/t) in 2016 to $847 per short ton ($934/t) in 2017). Cattle sales also increased by 2.7% from 2016 to 2017.

Crop	Annual value (billions of USD)
Dairy (milk and cream)	$6.56
§ Grapes	$5.79
§ Almonds	$5.60
§ Cannabis (legal sales)	$3.1
§ Strawberries	$3.1
Cattle and Calves	$2.63
§ Lettuce	$2.51
Walnuts	$1.59
§ Tomatoes	$1.05
Pistachios	$1.01
Broilers (poultry)	$0.94
Oranges	$0.93
§ Broccoli	$0.85
Hay	$0.76
Rice	$0.68
Carrots	$0.62
Lemons	$0.61
Tangerines	$0.54
Cotton	$0.48
§ Raspberries	$0.45
Garlic	$0.39

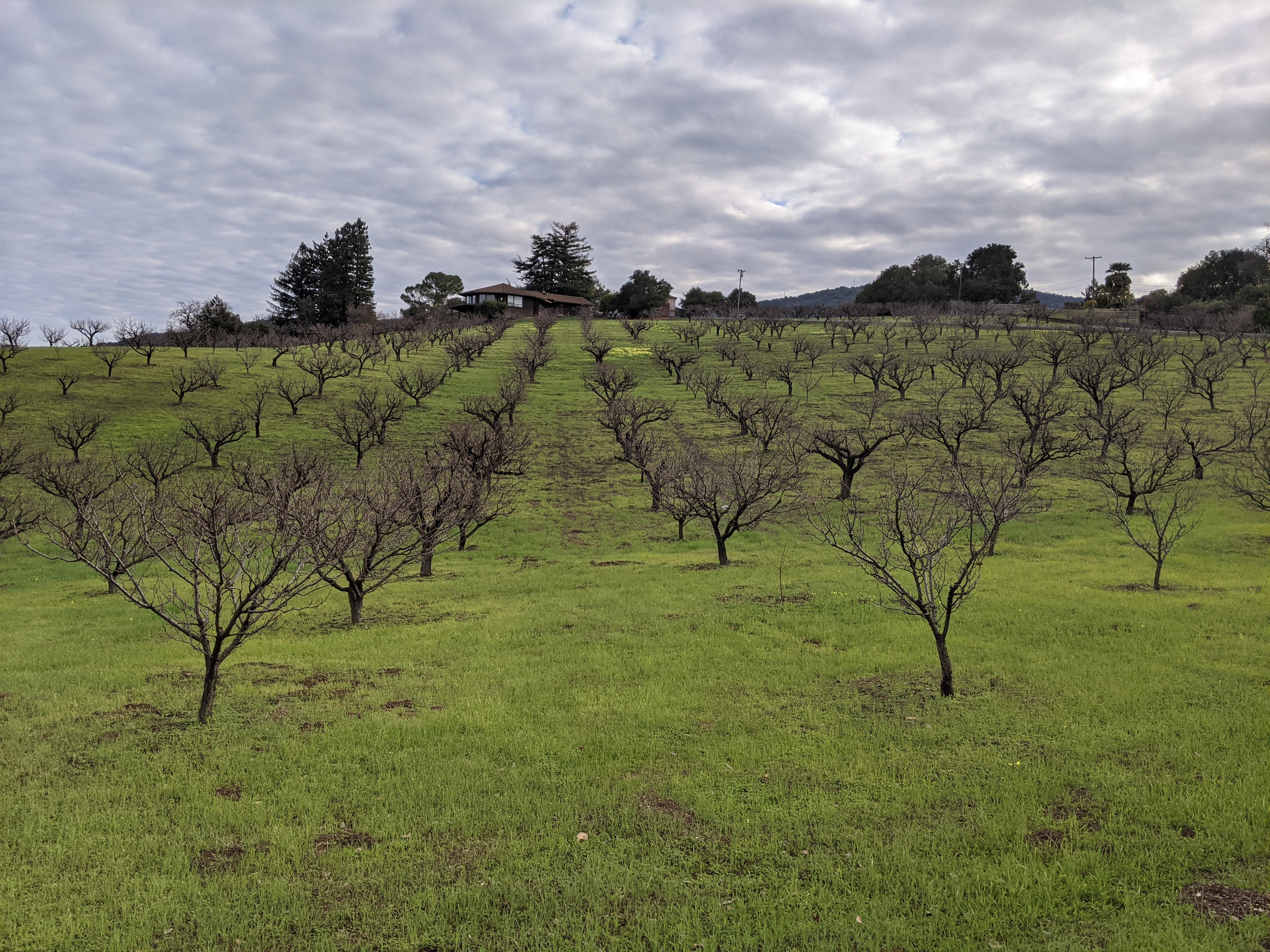
David Packard's home and apricots

== Specific crops ==
=== Alfalfa ===
Orloff et al., 2009 find Glyphosate use in this crop is driving resistance here. Blythe, California grows nearly 50,000 acres of Alfalfa. A total of 15,000 acres of this alfalfa land is owned by a Saudi Arabia-based Almarai, and this feed is exported to Saudi Arabia.

=== Almonds ===
California produces 80% of the world's almonds and 100% of the United States commercial supply. Although almonds are not native to California, a hot, dry Mediterranean climate and developed water infrastructure create favorable conditions for commercial cultivation of the crop.

Almonds are the state's most valuable export crop. Farmers exported $4.9 billion worth to foreign countries in 2019, about 22% of the state's total agricultural exports, with the European Union, China and India as leading destinations.

California almond farms import the majority of US commercial bee colonies to the state of California during the almond pollination season. Almond production in California is the source of several major environmental problems, including high demand for water and abundant waste of almond shells. As of 2021, due to a historic long-term drought in California, production was forecast to decline, and many almond orchards were being abandoned.

Shipping disruptions, reductions in consumer spending, and trade disputes during 2020-21 caused by the COVID-19 pandemic affected logistics and pricing of almonds.

Almonds contribute a mean of 0.77 pounds $\ce{N2O-N}$ emissions per acre per year in Mediterranean agriculture systems.

=== Apple ===
The Fuji variety is a recent import from Fujisaki, Aomori, Japan. Introduced in the 1980s, it quickly became the most produced apple here.

=== Apricot ===
For a common pest see § Cucumber Beetle.

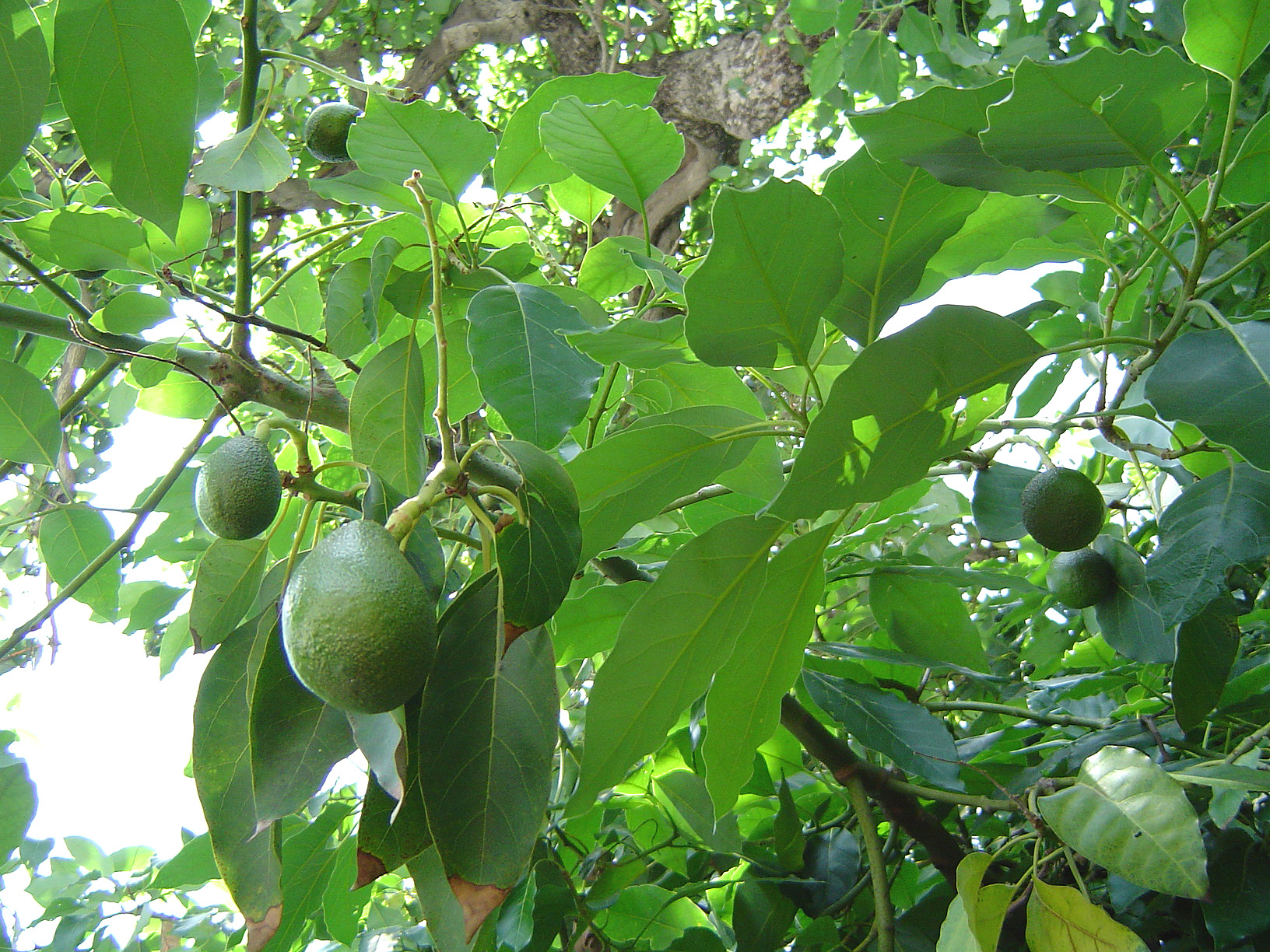
Huntington Library

=== Avocados ===
California farms produce 90% of all U.S.-grown avocados, with the great majority being of the Hass variety. In 2021 the state harvest was 135,500 short tons (122,900 t) on 46,700 acres (18,900 ha) for a yield of 2.9 short tons per acre (6.5 t/ha), and at $2,430 per short ton ($2,679/t) that brought $327,369,000. Drought and heat can significantly reduce the harvest in some years. The Polyphagous Shothole Borer and the associated disease it carries have been a great concern here since their discovery on home avocado trees in LA County in 2012. Immediately eradication and quarantine efforts were instituted, and are continuing. (See § Polyphagous shot hole borer below.)

For two invasive pests which have significantly reduced grower earnings see § Avocado Thrips and § Persea Mite.

=== Barley ===
Barley stripe rust was first found near Tehachapi in May 1915 on Hordeum murinum by Johnson and reported by Humphrey et al., 1924. Hungerford 1923 and Hungerford & Owens 1923 found the pathogen on cultivated barley in the central part of the state and also on H. murinum here. See also § Stripe Rust.

=== Blueberry ===
The California Blueberry Commission represents growers. UC IPM provides integrated pest management plans for blueberry (Vaccinium spp.).

=== Broccoli ===
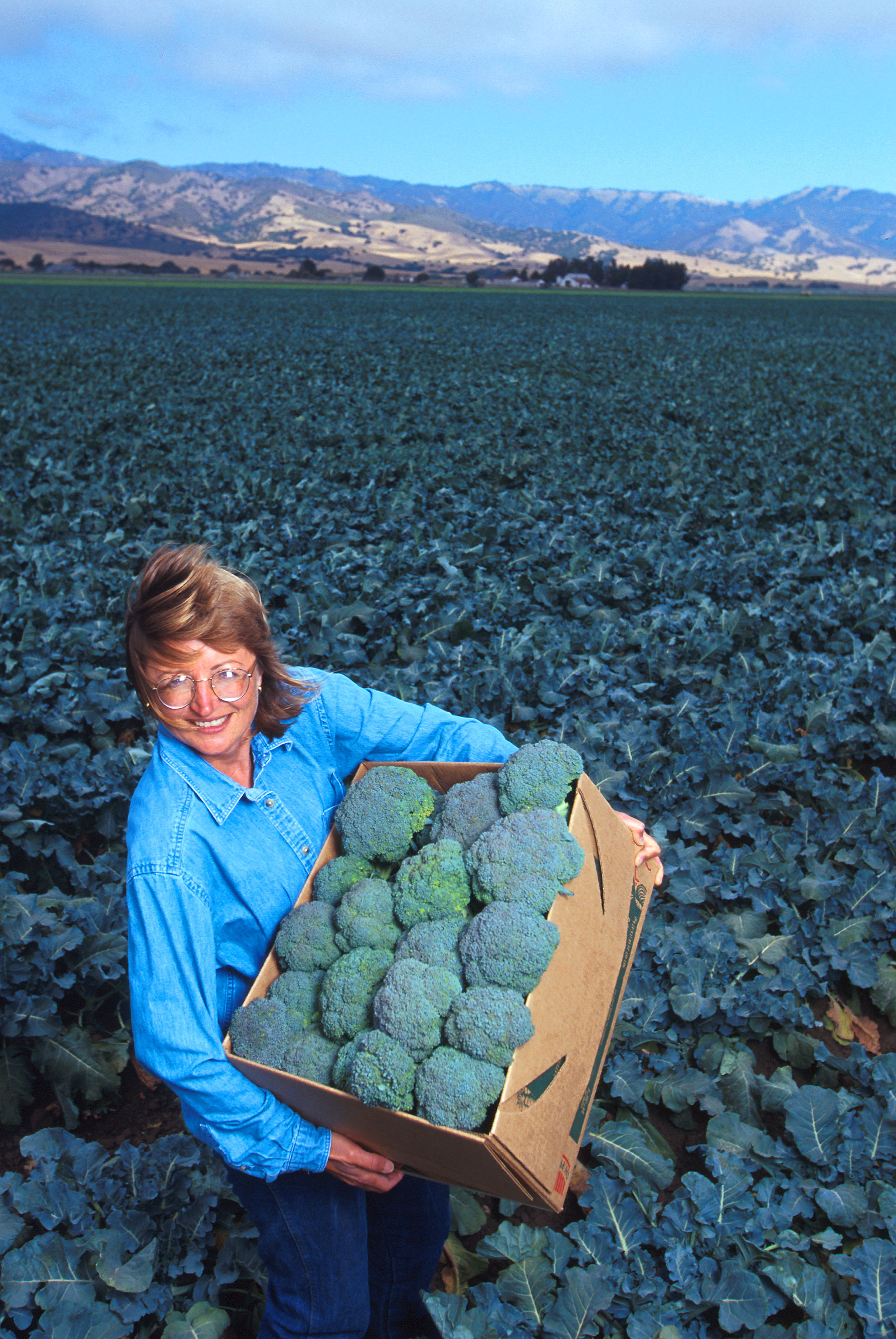
Pesticide test plot, Salinas

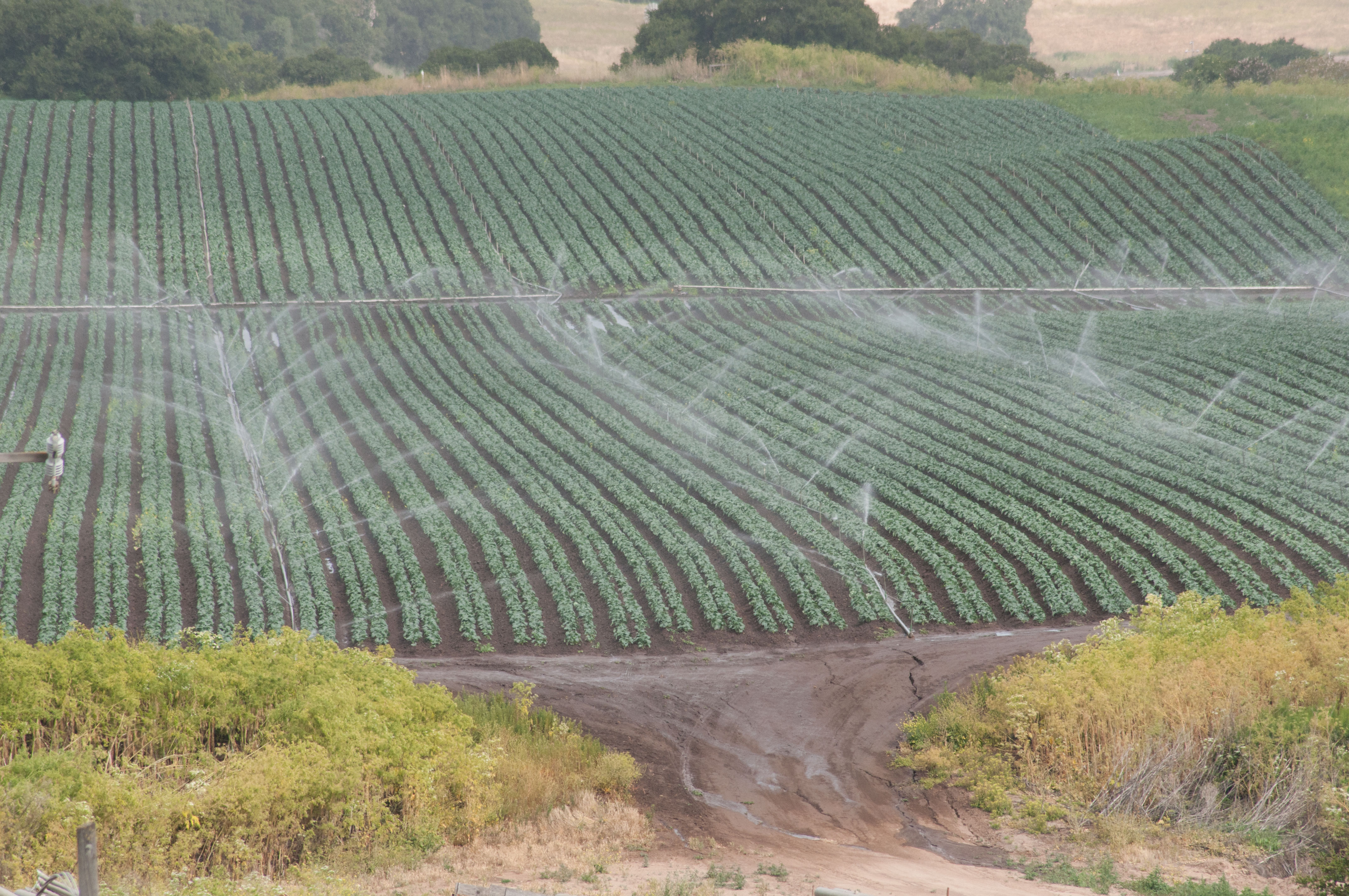
Broccoli field, Salinas

Almost all of the country's broccoli is grown here. In 2021 that was 11,200 planted acres (4,500 ha), all of which was harvested. The yield was 130.0 short hundredweight per acre (14,570 kg/ha; 13,000 lb/acre) for a harvest of 1,512,000 short hundredweight (68,600 t; 75,600 short tons). There was only trace wastage. Selling at a price of $51.50 per short hundredweight ($0.5150/lb; $1.135/kg), the year sold for $631,455,000.

For an invasive pest of this crop see the painted bug § Bagrada hilaris.

The typical biomass of harvest residue in the coastal regions is 5 dry short tons per hectare (1.8 t/acre). This is not necessarily a waste product, as it can be useful as fumigant.

=== Caneberry ===
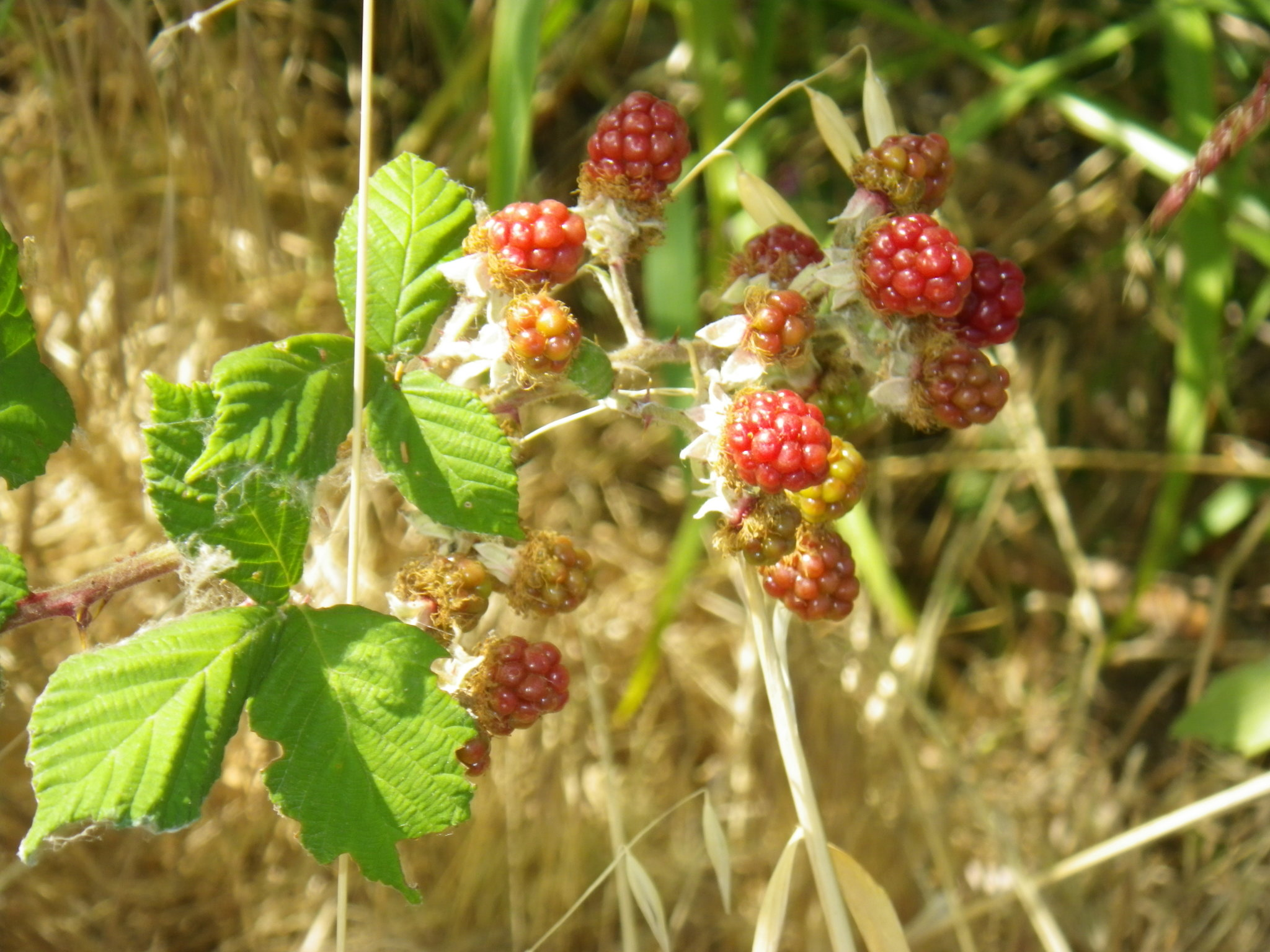
California Blackberry

Caneberries (Rubus spp.) grown here include raspberry (see § Raspberry), blackberry, dewberry, olallieberry, and boysenberry.

For a common disease of erect and trailing caneberry (excluding raspberry), see § Leaf Spot of Caneberry.

=== Cannabis ===
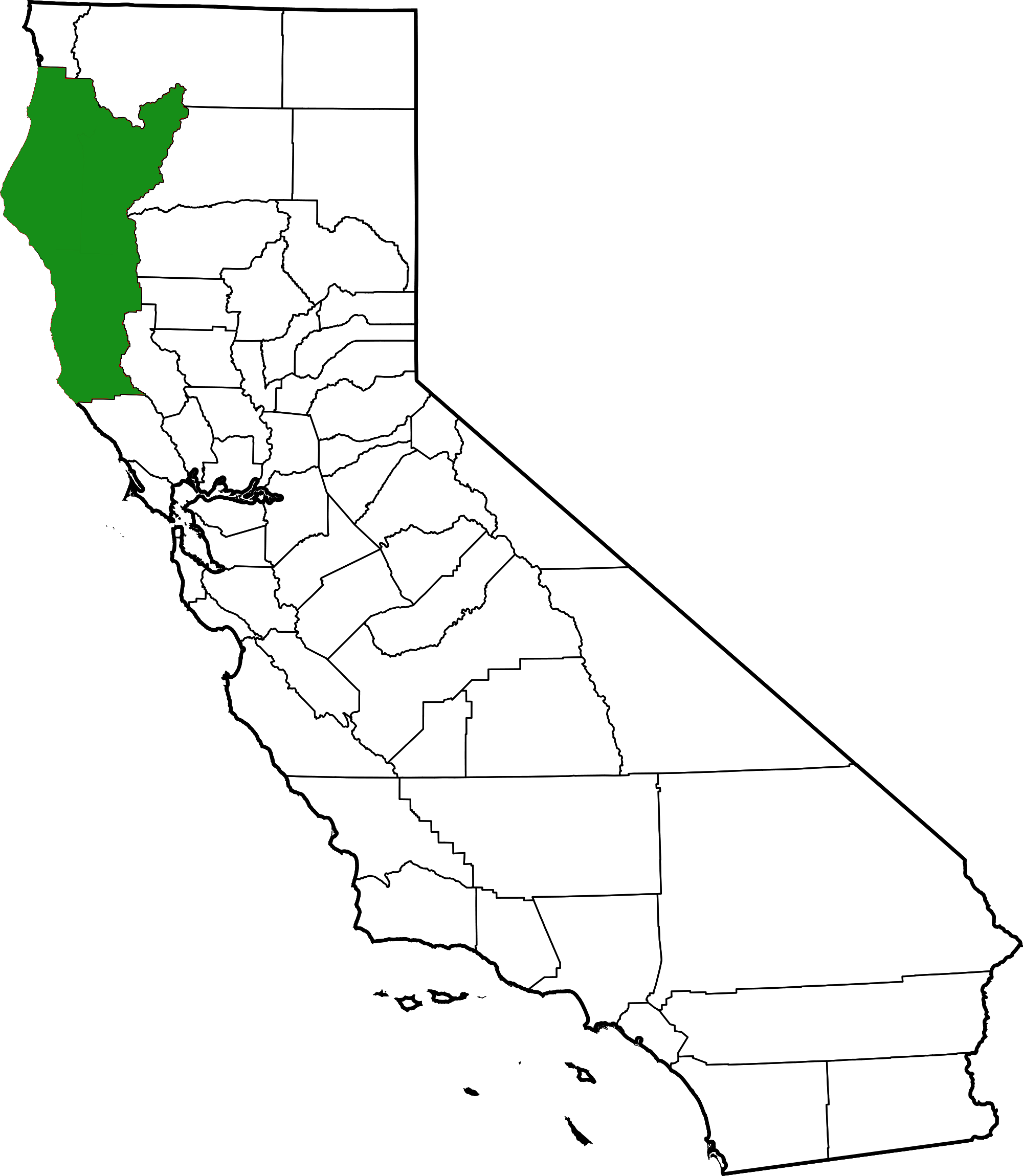
Emerald Triangle

Cannabis is estimated to be the largest cash crop in California with a value of more than $11 billion. The state provided most of the cannabis consumed in the United States prior to legalization which was intended to provide a transition to legal, licensed growing. The California Environmental Quality Act (CEQA) requires a detailed analysis of the environmental impact of growers operations. Statewide, 208 growers had obtained regular, annual licenses by July 2019. At this point of some 18 months into legalization, 1,532 growers were still operating on provisional permits as they went through the CEQA process that requires extensive paperwork. Smaller farms were given five years to become established under legalization before larger growers were allowed to enter the market. Under the regulations set to expire in 2023, growers can have only one medium licence but there is no limit on the number of small licenses an individual grower can have. This loophole has allowed larger growers to operate.

Humboldt, Mendocino, and Trinity counties have long been known as Northern California's Emerald Triangle as it is estimated that 60 percent or more of all cannabis consumed in the United States is grown there. Registering and applying for permits has not been an easy decision for many long time growers in these three counties.

In Santa Barbara County, cannabis growing has taken over greenhouses that formerly grew flowers. In the first four months of legalization, the county had almost 800 permits issued for cultivators, the most of any county in the state.

Calaveras County registered more than seven hundred cultivators after county voters approved a tax in 2016.

=== Cherries ===
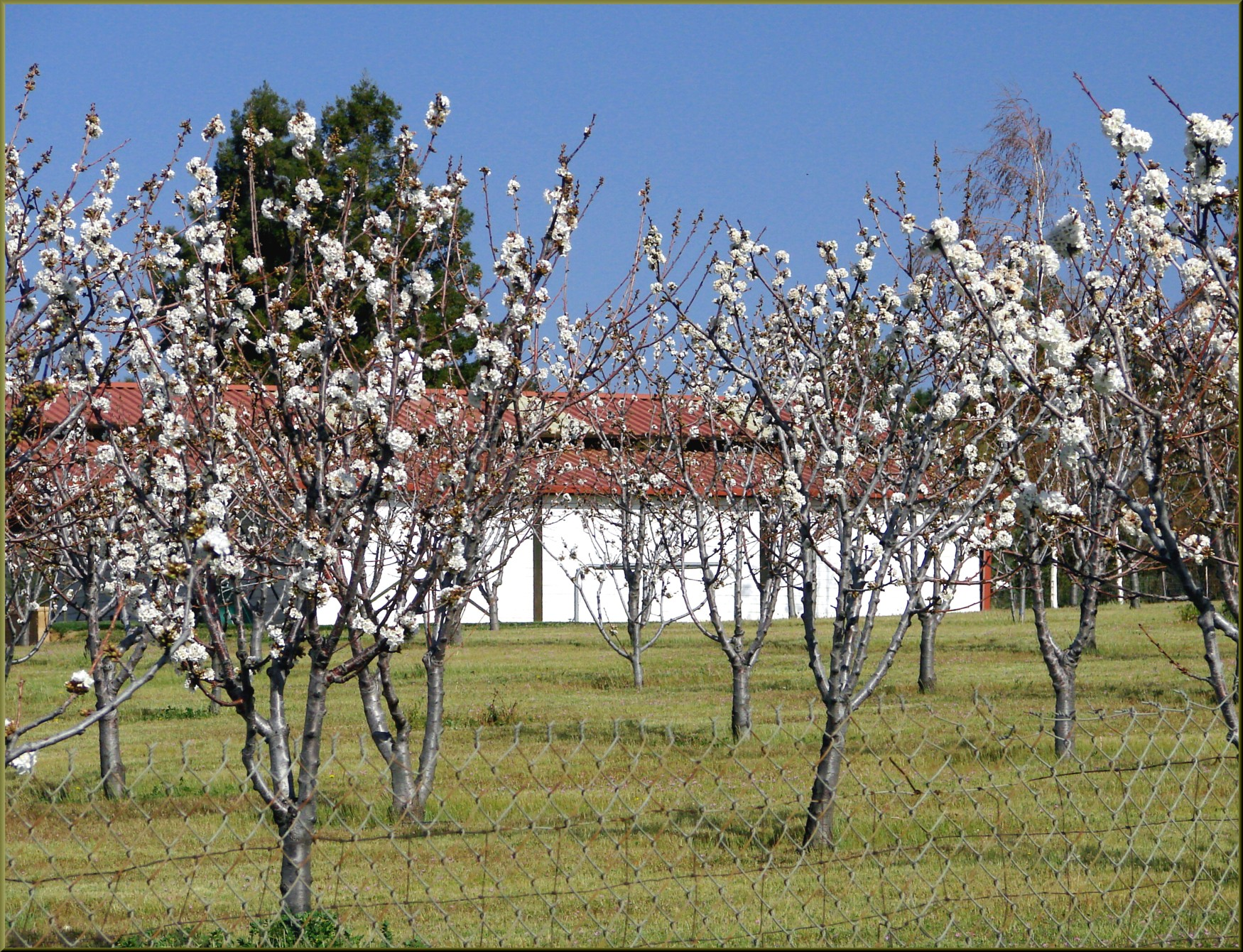
Cherry Valley

The California Cherry Board is a state marketing order representing growers and intermediaries here. The USDA FAS's Market Access Program funds international advertising especially in Canada, South Korea, Japan, China, and Australia. The state produces the earliest crop in the year starting in mid-April. Lasting until early or mid-June every year, this is the second heaviest harvest after Washington.

Planting density is usually about 100 trees per acre (250/ha) and the first real crop will be about six years later. Honey bees are essential to pollination for this crop. Cultivars grown here are harvested by hand with the stem (pedicel).

The center of the state produces a large percentage of the crop and San Joaquin County, near Lodi is the highest producing county. Many of these are Bing. As of 2022 newer Bing strains with better heat tolerance have recently been planted here as well as counties further south.

Birds are common pests in cherry orchards.

=== Citrus ===
Citrus cultivation in California began with the Spanish missionaries, who planted oranges and lemons at Baja California around 1739 and at Alta California missions by 1769. Early fruit was thick-skinned and sour, not suited for commercial markets. The first sizable grove was established at Mission San Gabriel in 1804, with about 400 trees on six acres. This mission-based agriculture ended with secularization which closed the missions and gave away their lands in 1835. Jean-Louis Vignes likely planted the first private orange grove in Los Angeles in 1834. William Wolfskill was the first commercial citrus grower in California, planting his orchard in Los Angeles in 1841. By 1862, his orchards held two-thirds of California's orange trees, marking him as the founder of the state's commercial citrus industry. The California gold rush (from 1849) increased demand for oranges, especially for their vitamin C, which helped prevent scurvy among miners. This spurred gradual expansion of orchards. In the early 1870s, Wolfskill's reported profits of $1,000 per acre attracted more farmers to citrus growing.

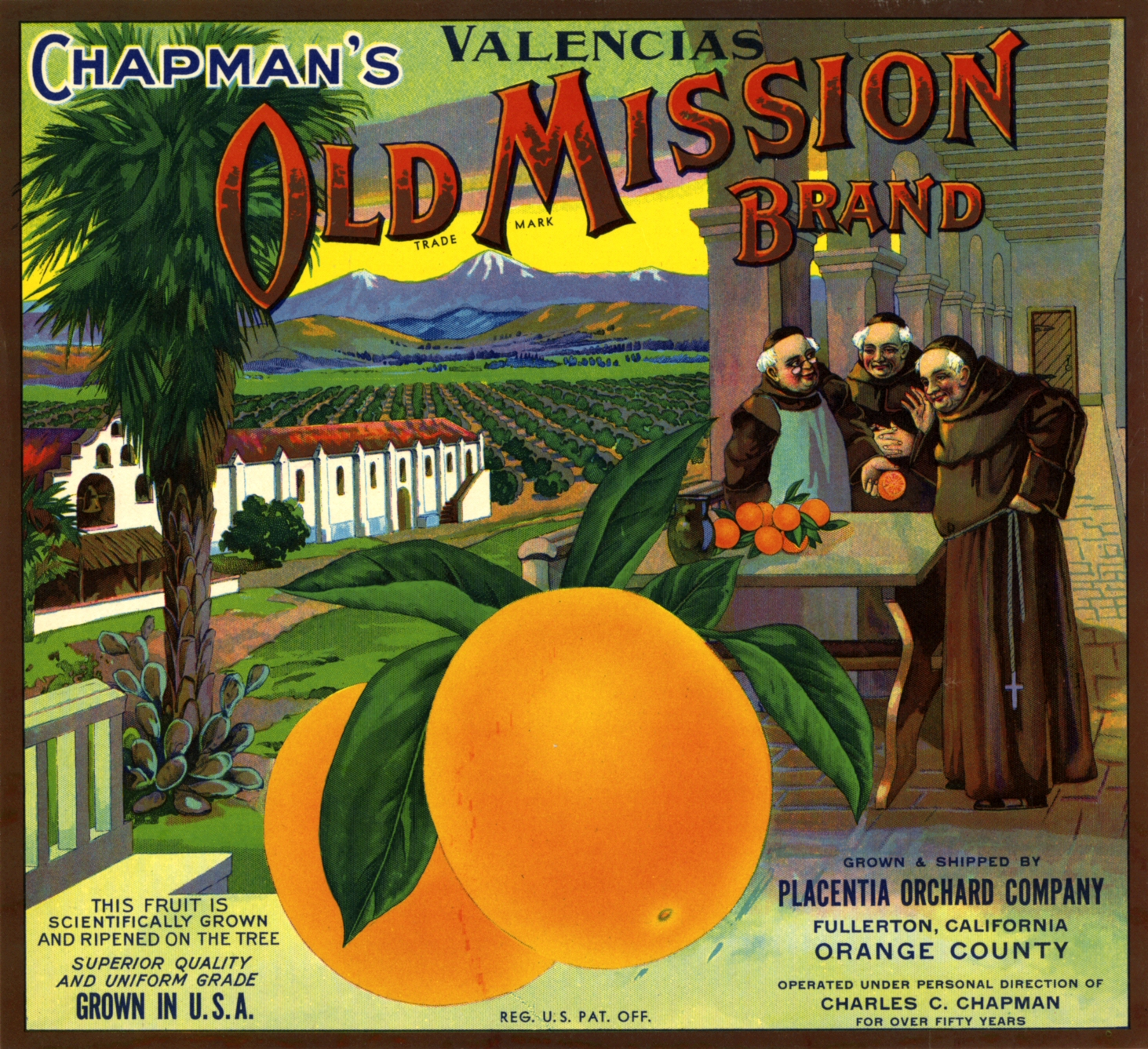
Advertisement for the Valencia orange, which became the major industrial crop by the 1920s--but despite the illustration this particular variety was unknown in the mission era.

The 1870s saw the introduction of improved fruit varieties. In 1873, navel orange plants from Brazil were distributed by the U.S. Department of Agriculture. Luther C. Tibbets and Eliza Tibbets successfully cultivated these in Riverside, leading to widespread planting of the sweet, seedless navel orange, which became the backbone of the California citrus industry. The Valencia orange, introduced in 1876, matured in summer and fall, complementing the winter-ripening navel and providing oranges year-round. The Eureka lemon (from Sicily) and Lisbon lemon (from Spain) were introduced in the same period, offering improved varieties and year-round crops. Grapefruit was introduced from Florida in the 1880s. The completion of major railroads (Southern Pacific in 1877, and the Santa Fe in 1885) and the introduction of ventilated boxcars revolutionized distribution, opening national markets and triggering a planting frenzy in southern California. By 1885, the number of citrus trees in California had grown from 90,000 (in 1875) to 2 million, and to 4.5 million by 1901.

The 1890s brought pest control advances (spraying, fumigation) and frost protection (heaters, later wind machines). The University of California established its Citrus Experiment Station in 1907, supporting research and innovation. Cooperative marketing emerged with the formation of the California Fruit Growers Exchange in 1905, later known as Sunkist Growers Inc., which helped standardize and market California citrus worldwide.

In the early 20th century California dominated the nation's citrus supply, especially from Los Angeles and Orange counties. Since then the geography has shifted. Florida is now dominant in oranges. By the 1980s, California supplied about 75% of the nation's lemons. It was the second largest orange producer in the U.S., ranked third in grapefruit, and was a major source of limes and tangerines. Today about 90% of the state's citrus production is located in five counties, namely Fresno, Kern, Tulare, Ventura and Riverside. Apart from home gardens, citrus is no longer a factor in Orange and Los Angeles counties.

The Mediterranean climate affords a lower rate of post-harvest disease than in some of the world's growing regions, similar to the Mediterranean itself, Australia, and most of South Africa. Postharvest problems that do occur tend to be mostly blue and green Penicillium spp. The Asian citrus psyllid was discovered in Southern California in 2008 and eradication and quarantine are now underway. (See § Asian citrus psyllid below.)

=== Cotton ===
Gossypium spp. are extensively grown in the Imperial Valley.

§ Pink Bollworm spread to California from its original introduction in Texas. Despite wide establishment elsewhere in the southwest the San Joaquin Valley did not suffer permanent establishment. SJV was protected by its sterile insect technique (SIT) program although neighbouring areas were continuously infested. UC IPM provides management information.

California was an early adopter of Bt cotton, but at a low proportion of acreage. The SJV does not use it at all. However Bt resistance has been slow to develop here and in Arizona and in Texas. In the California/Arizona population Tabashnik et al., 2022 find Cry1Ac resistance and Cry2Ab resistance are common but the causative mutations do not cause Vip3Aa resistance.

§ Bemisia tabaci strain B is common in the Imperial Valley. The use of pyrethroids in the 1980s failed to control it and in deed caused a population increase.

The southwest water shortage is reducing yield and acreage in the 2020s.

Interferometric synthetic aperture radar (InSAR) surveys show this crop is a significant cause of groundwater-related subsidence.

§ 1,3-dichloropropene and § Chloropicrin are effective against the complex of § Fusarium oxysporum f. sp. vasinfectum and Nematode.

Ortiz et al., 2017 provides a polymerase chain reaction (PCR) method which differentiates the California race 4 strain from all others based on the PHO gene. University of California Integrated Pest Management (UC IPM) provides practices for its control including Glenn County.

Some Pythium spp. are seedborne diseases in cotton. UC IPM provide management information.

Several Tetranychus spider mite species are common on cotton here including the Pacific Spider Mite (Tetranychus pacificus), the Two-Spotted Spider Mite (T. urticae) and T. cinnabarinus.

Eradication of the § Pink Bollworm in this and neighbouring states was greatly aided by the deployment of Bt cotton. The eradication program began elsewhere and was extended to the California Cotton Belt in 2007. Dennehy et al., 2011 find bollworm remained 100% susceptible to Cry1Ac and Cry2Ab2 through 2005 here and in Arizona.

Pyrethrins are commonly used in this crop.

Deynze et al., 2005 performs the first gene flow analysis in California cotton. Deynze finds pollinators are responsible for almost 100%.

Lacewings and whiteflies (§ Bemisia tabaci strain B) are common pests of this crop.

G. barbadense is grown in a small part of the country including the southern part of this state.

Delia platura is a common seed predator of this crop.

Limonius spp. are pests of germination and seedling stage.

§ Lygus hesperus is often confused for other species including some beneficial insects.

Spodoptera praefica is a late season pest and rarely an early season pest.

§ Blapstinus spp. affect seedlings.

Empoasca fabae is the most common leafhopper in the San Joaquin Valley.

Euschistus servus damages bolls.

§ Spodoptera exigua is a pest of seedlings, young plants, squares and early bolls.

Caliothrips fasciatus is a pest of the mature plant.

The larvae of § Heliothis virescens are pests of bolls and squares.

Gryllus spp. are pests of the early stages.

Bucculatrix thurberiella's harm is limited to the southern deserts only.

Autographa californica is found mostly in May and early June here.

§ Aphis gossypii is the most common aphid in this crop.

§ Agrotis ipsilon is a pest of the young plants.

=== Cucumbers ===
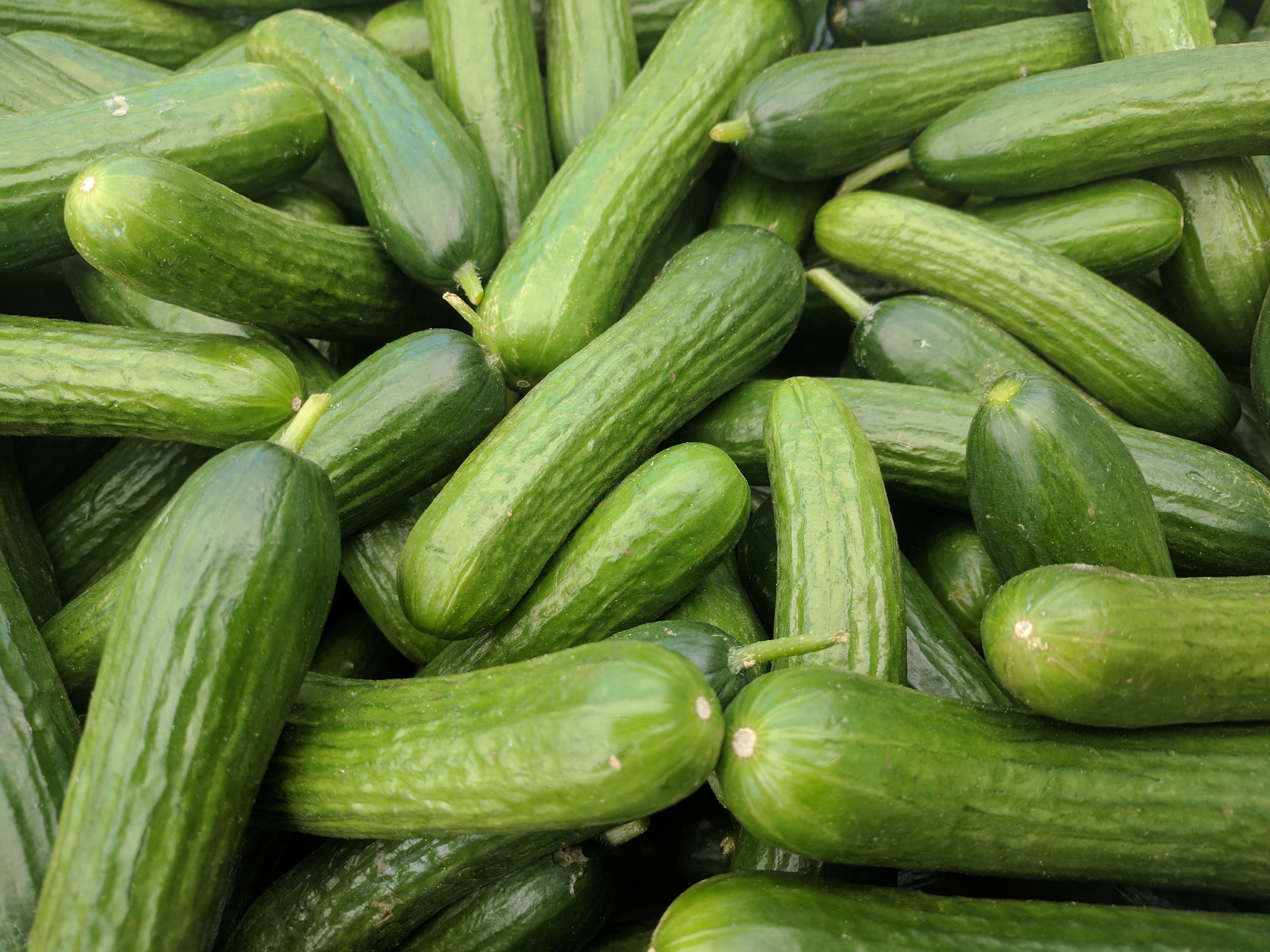
Campbell farmer's market

From 1997–2000, the state's acreage varied between 10,500–11,000 acres (4,200–4,500 ha) bringing in $57,969,000–$67,744,000. By 2021 however the harvest was down to 1,038,500 short hundredweight (47,110 t; 51,920 short tons) from 6,700 acres (2,700 ha) for a yield of 155 short hundredweight per acre (17.4 t/ha; 7.8 short ton/acre), and at $23.2 per short hundredweight ($510/t; $464/short ton) that brought only $24,043,000.

=== Dairy ===
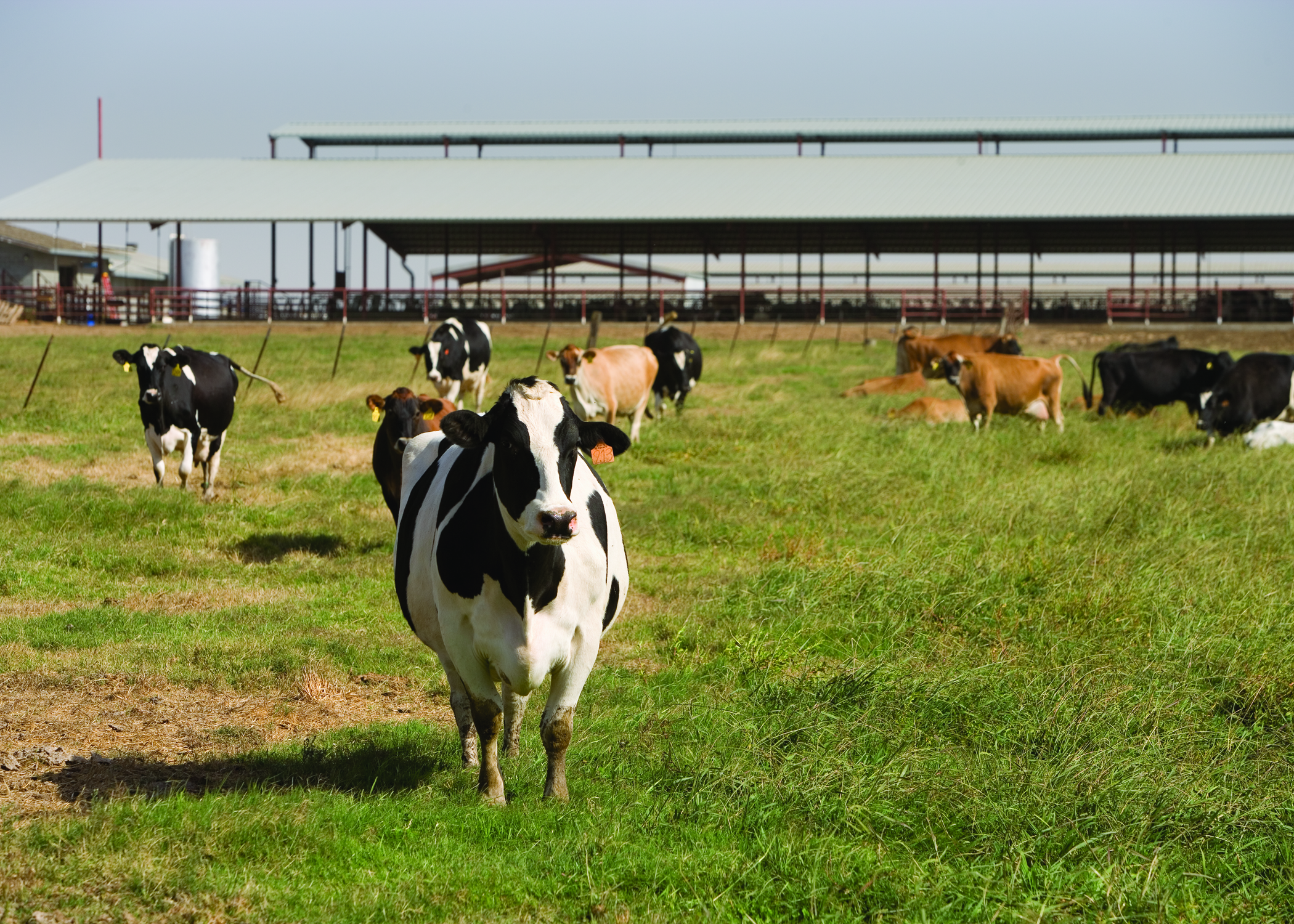
USDA photo of dairy cow in pasture, California

The California dairy industry is a significant part of the agricultural output of the state of California. Milk has the highest farm revenue among California agricultural commodities. California ranks first out of the fifty states in dairy production. In 2020 the state had about 1,300 dairy farms and 1.727 million dairy cows. As of 2018, the state produced nearly 20 percent of all U.S. milk.

=== Dates ===
Over 90% of US production is grown here, and most of that in the Coachella Valley. The distant second is Arizona. The 2020 harvest was 49,300 short tons (44,700 t) from 12,500 acres (5,100 ha), for a yield of 3.94 short tons per acre (8.8 t/ha). The year's crop sold for $114 million, an average of $2,320 per short ton ($2,557/t). The harvest extends from the beginning of October to the middle of December.

The detection of the Red Palm Weevil (Rhynchophorus ferrugineus) in 2010 was very concerning to this valuable industry. See § Red Palm Weevil.

=== Figs ===
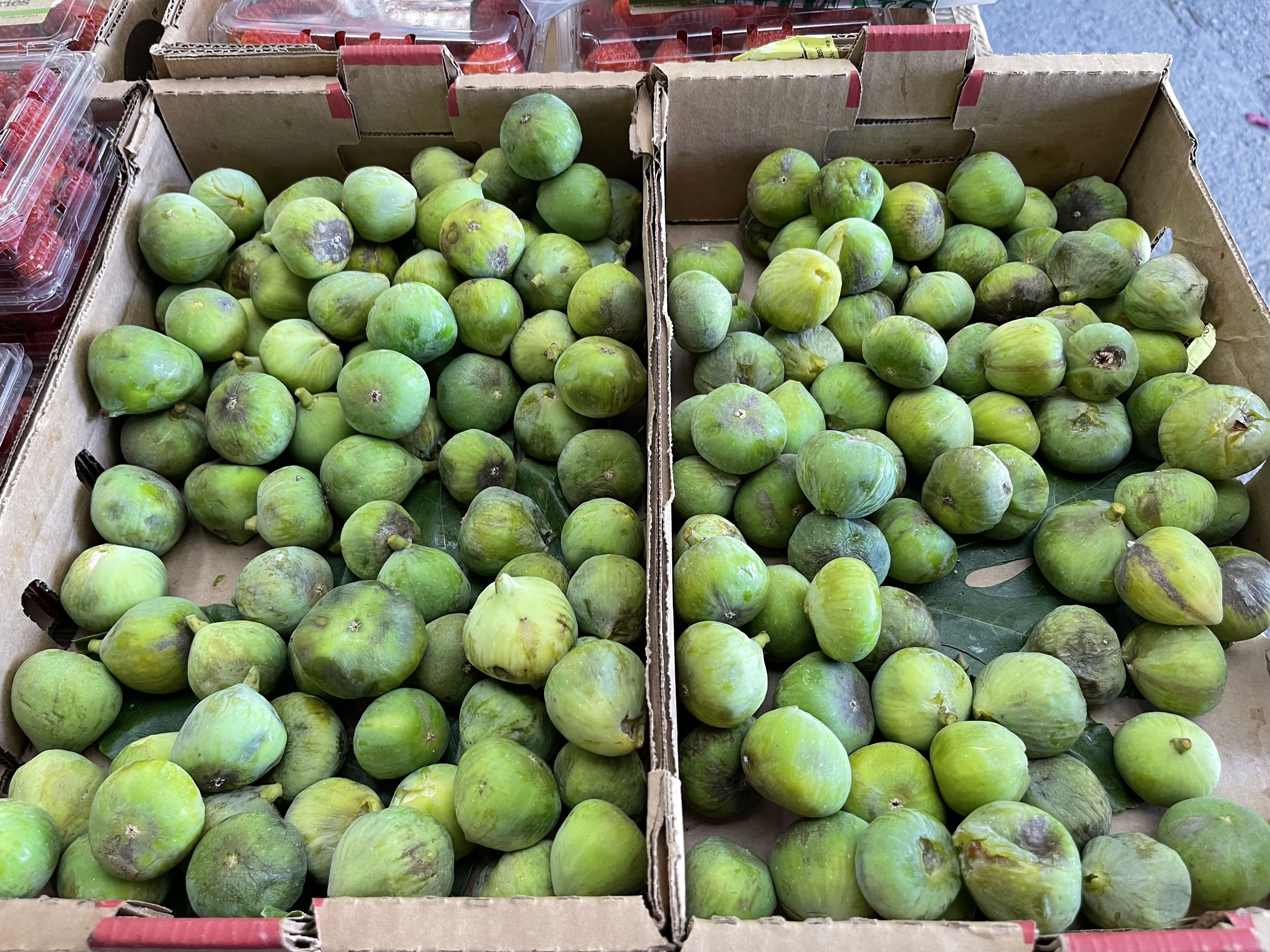
Santa Rosa

Calimyrna is a common cultivar here.

Commodity figs here suffer from many insect pests here. See § Carpenter worm, § Darkling ground beetle, § Dried fruit beetle, § Freeman sap beetle, § Confused sap beetle, § Fig beetle, § Fig mite, § Fig scale, and § Navel orangeworm.

For common diseases see § Fig Smut and § Alternaria Rot of Fig.

=== Fish and shellfish ===
Relative to traditional farming, aquaculture is a small part of California's agricultural economy, generating only $175 million in 2014. Oysters, abalone, mussels, channel catfish, rainbow trout, and salmon are farmed commercially.

=== Grapes ===
The 2020 table grape harvest was worth $2.12 billion while wine grapes brought in $1.7 billion, down 15.3% year-on-year. By weight, this was 17% lower versus 2018. The next year, 2021 saw a much better yield. From 829,000 acres (335,000 ha) viniculturists got 6.94 short tons per acre (15.6 t/ha) for a total harvest of 5,755,000 short tons (5,221,000 t). At an average of $909 per short ton ($1,002/t) they were paid $5,229,902,000 for the season. Of that, 4,844,600 short tons (4,394,900 t) were for destined for processing industries (including wine, see § Wine below) and at $835 per short ton ($920/t) that was worth $4,046,382,000. The fresh (table grape) harvest was 910,400 short tons (825,900 t) and selling at a price of $1,300 per short ton ($1,433/t), this sector was worth $1,183,520,000 for the season.

The table grape and wine grape sectors are represented by the and the California Association of Winegrape Growers.

Table production is most concentrated in three counties and somewhat in another two. Dollar value annually is $1,240 million in Kern, $682 in Tulare, $416 in Fresno, and in the top ten crops in Riverside and Madera. California's own consumption of table production grew from 1980 to 2001 from 1.8 to 3.5 kilograms (4.0 to 7.7 lb) per capita per year. Consumption here and throughout the country is so high that the country remains a net importer despite this state's production, which reached 71,000 short tons (64,000 t) in the 2015 table harvest.

During dormancy, UC IPM recommends pruning. UC IPM publishes recommendations for this and other tasks during dormancy. Although thinning is often proven to improve wine qualities in many areas, some reviewers note a lack of benefit in thinning table grapes in this state's vineyards.

Deyett et al., 2020 finds Proteobacteria are the most common components of the microbiomes of this crop in this state's soils.

This crop has also played a large part in farm labor relations in the state. The Delano grape strike began among table grape workers before spreading to other industries. See § Labor.

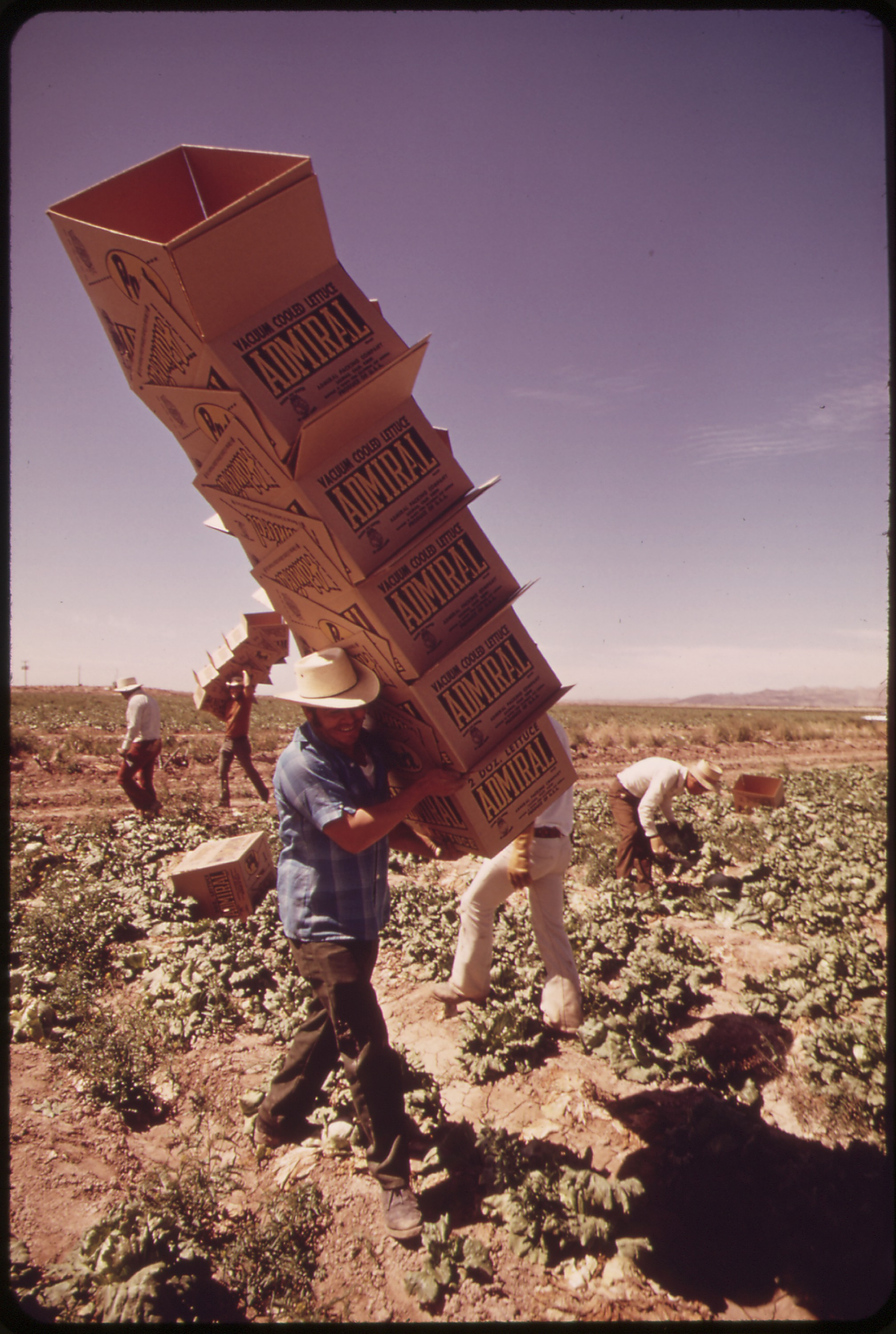
Along the Colorado River

=== Lettuce ===
UCCE's Vegetable Research & Information Center provides comprehensive production advice for this crop.

Lettuce (Lactuca sativa) is commercially grown in the Central Valley, Central Coast, and deserts (the Imperial and Coachella valleys). It is one of the most labor-intensive crops in the state.

Aphids are a major problem for lettuce on the Central Coast. See § Nasonovia ribisnigri for an important aphid, and § Toxomerus marginatus and § Platycheirus stegnus for biocontrols.

The Beet Armyworm (BAW, Spodoptera exigua) is a polyphagous insect pest in this crop. There is wide geographic variation in timing with BAW, the San Joaquin Valley being vulnerable more in fall than spring, the Central Coast late summer, and lower desert valleys September and October in established crops and November and December in young plants. Natural control is significant, from parasitoids Hyposoter exiguae, Chelonus insularis, and Lespesia archippivora, and Spodoptera exigua nuclear polyhedrosis virus (SeNPV). Discing as soon as possible after harvest and weed control to deny alternate hosts will help. Insecticides used include methoxyfenozide, Bacillus thuringiensis ssp. aizawai, SeNPV, chlorantraniliprole, spinosad, indoxacarb, emamectin benzoate, methomyl, ζ-cypermethrin, and permethrin. In organic, Bacillus thuringiensis and Entrust are used but note that any spinosad (including Entrust) will also harm the parasitoids.

=== Melons ===
For a common pest see § Cotton Aphid.

=== Nectarines ===
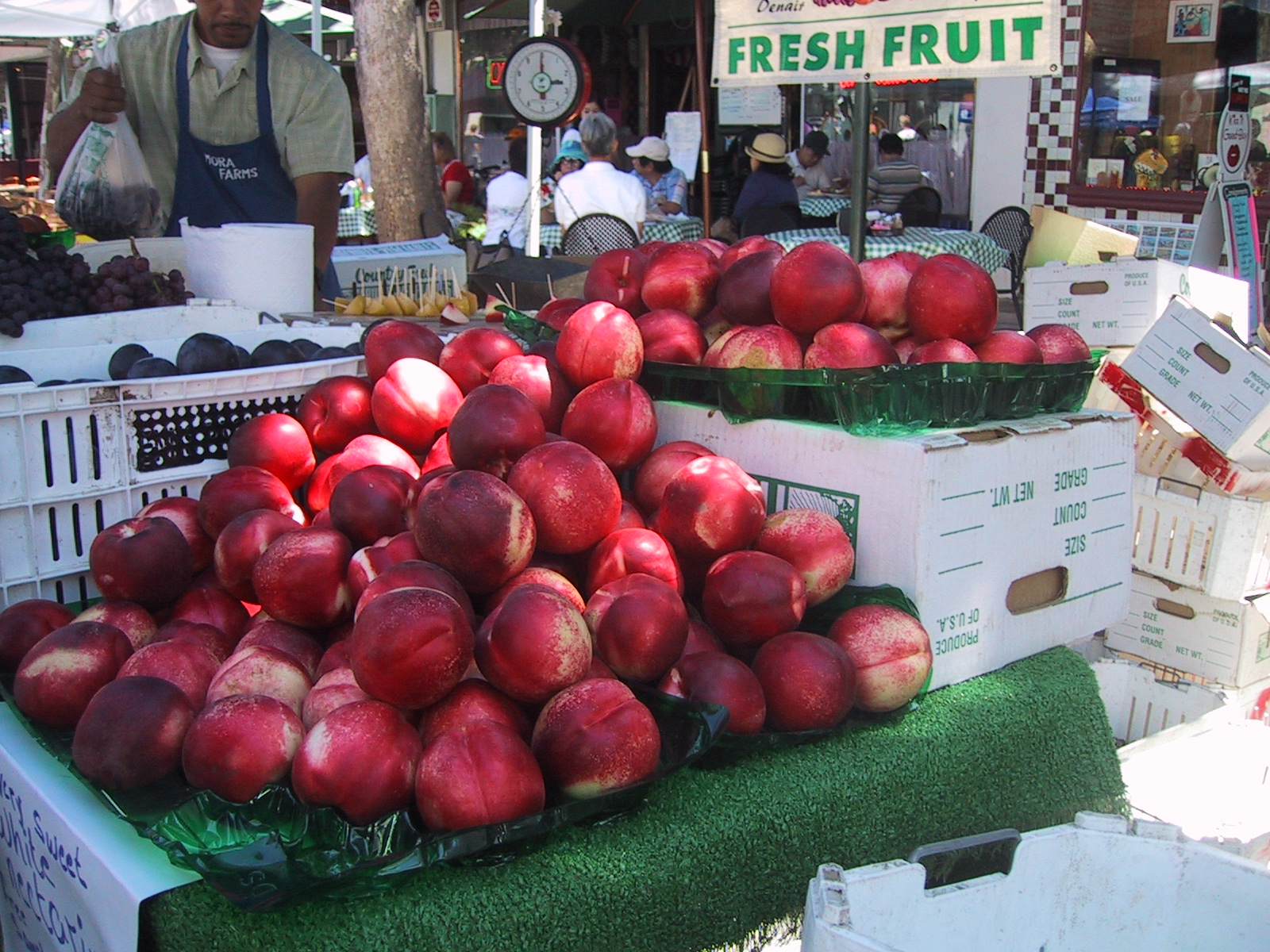

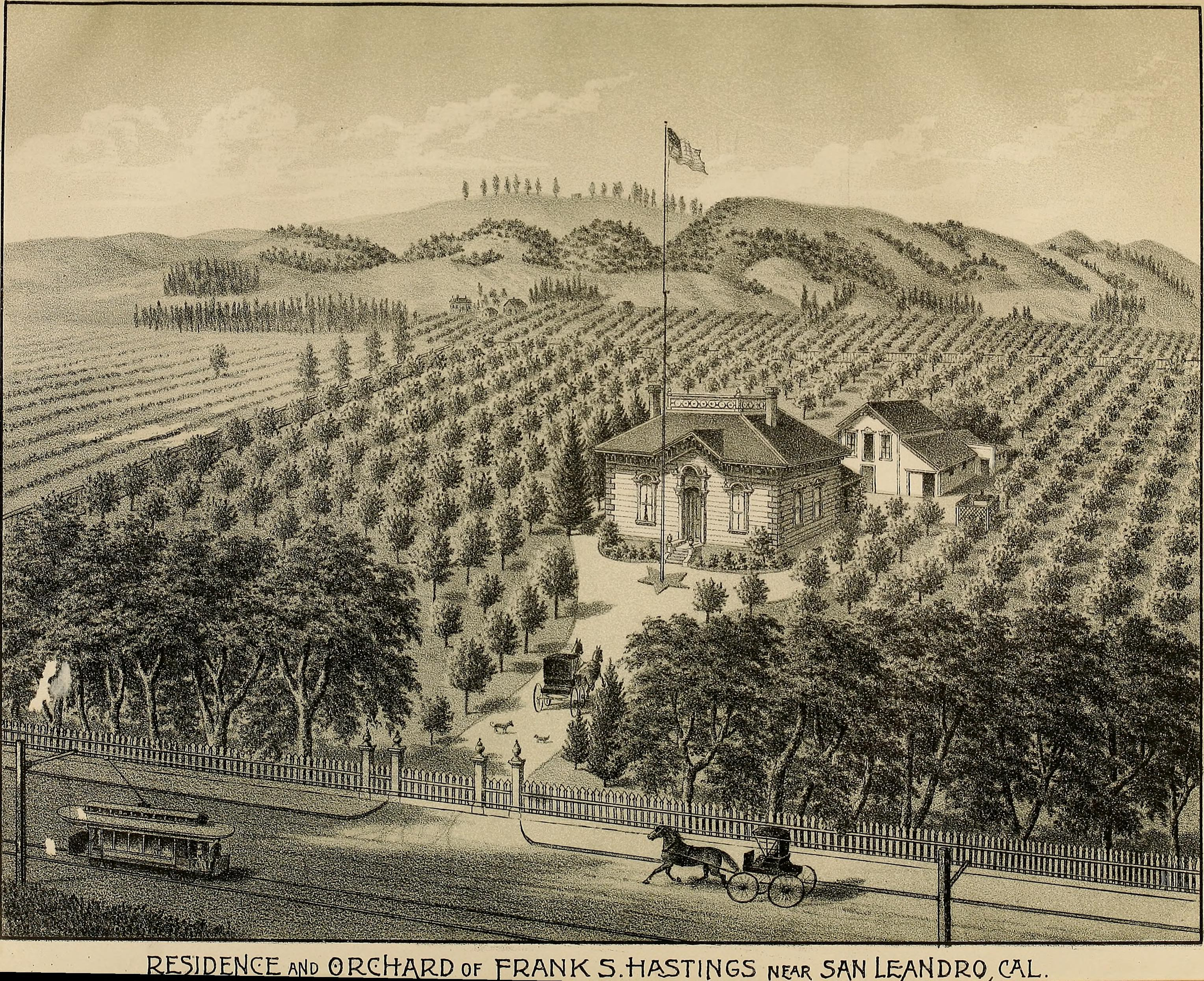
1893 engraving of a Mission with nectarine trees

Because nectarines are hairless peaches, for most information see § Peaches.

=== Oak ===
Oaks (genus Quercus) are cultivated for ornamental purposes and sometimes for acorns. For a devastating disease see § Sudden Oak Death.

=== Okra ===
Okra is not produced in any significant amount in California. Imperial County grows the largest number of acres in the state.

=== Oleander ===
Oleander (Nerium spp.) suffers from various Xylella fastidiosa diseases here and there is some question as to whether and to what degree it shares inoculum with other crops including food crops.

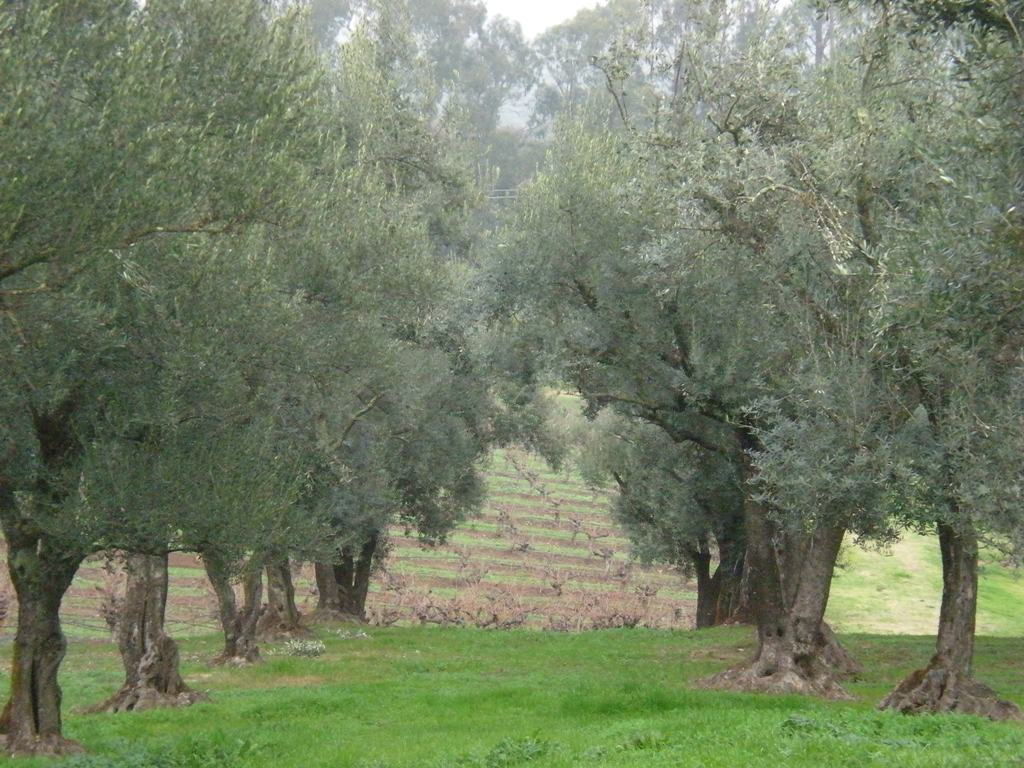
B. R. Cohn Winery, 2008

=== Olives ===
Newton Pierce surveyed olive culture in the state and throughout the country for the United States Department of Agriculture (USDA) in 1897.

Olives throughout the state suffer from the introduced Olive Fruit Fly. Neofusicoccum mediterraneum, Diplodia mutila, and D. seriata cause significant disease here. More specific controls than currently available are needed for N. mediterraneum in highly susceptible cultivars, namely Sevillano and Gordal, and early harvest may be needed for D. seriata. See § Olive Fruit Fly, § Neofusicoccum mediterraneum, § Diplodia mutila, and § Diplodia seriata.

The Olive Oil Commission of California was founded in 2014 as an entity of the State of California. The commission was established as a result of a bill introduced by Lois Wolk. The primary goal is to improve the sales of olive oil grown in California.

The acreage of table olives declined by 55 percent between 2005 and 2025.

=== Parsley ===
Soil solarization is an alternative to soil treatment with methyl bromide. Stapleton et al., 2005 eliminate almost 100% of annual weeds in this crop with solarization alone. It completely fails against yellow nutsedge however.

=== Peaches ===
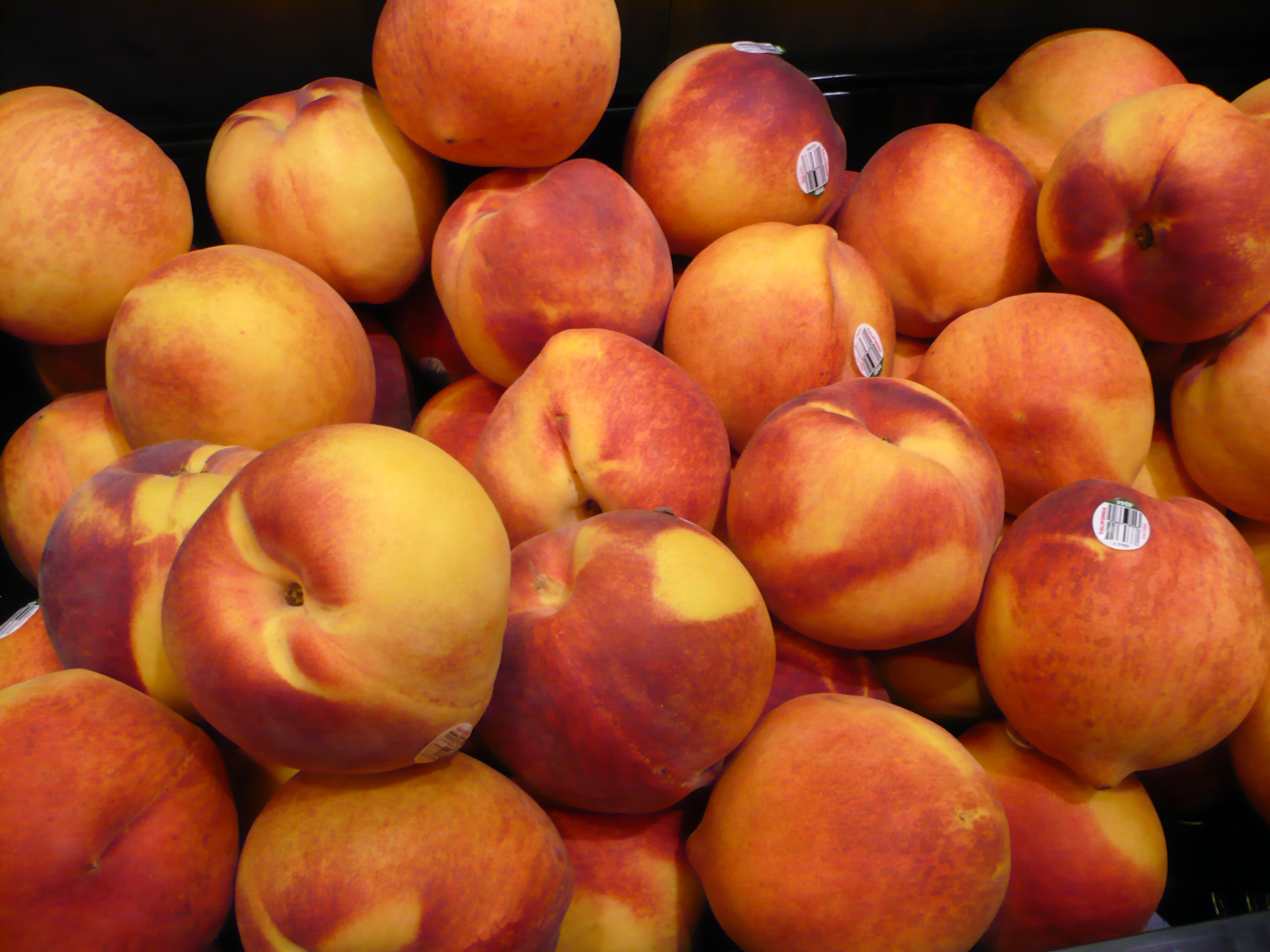
Grocery store in Fortuna, 2014

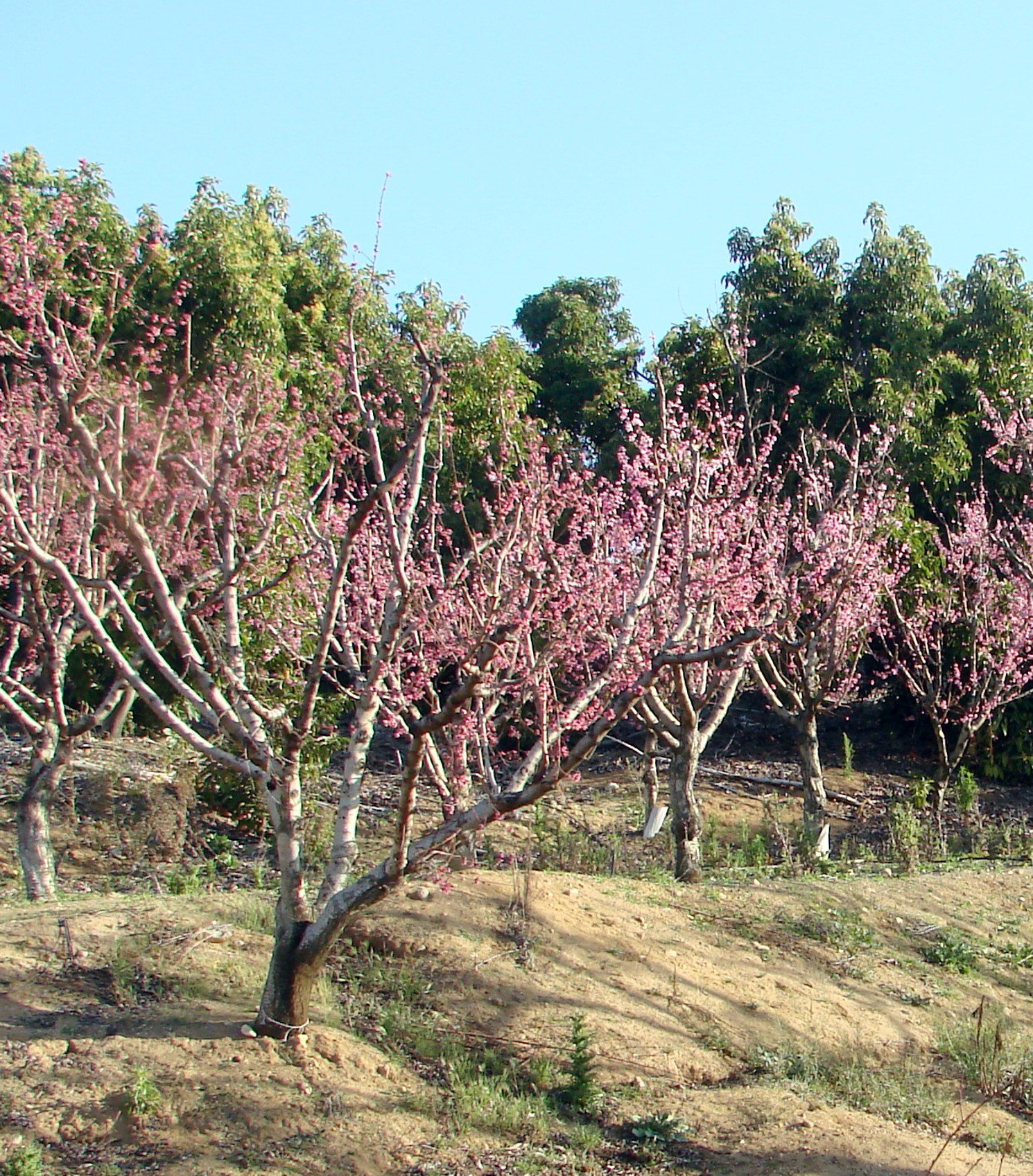
Redlands

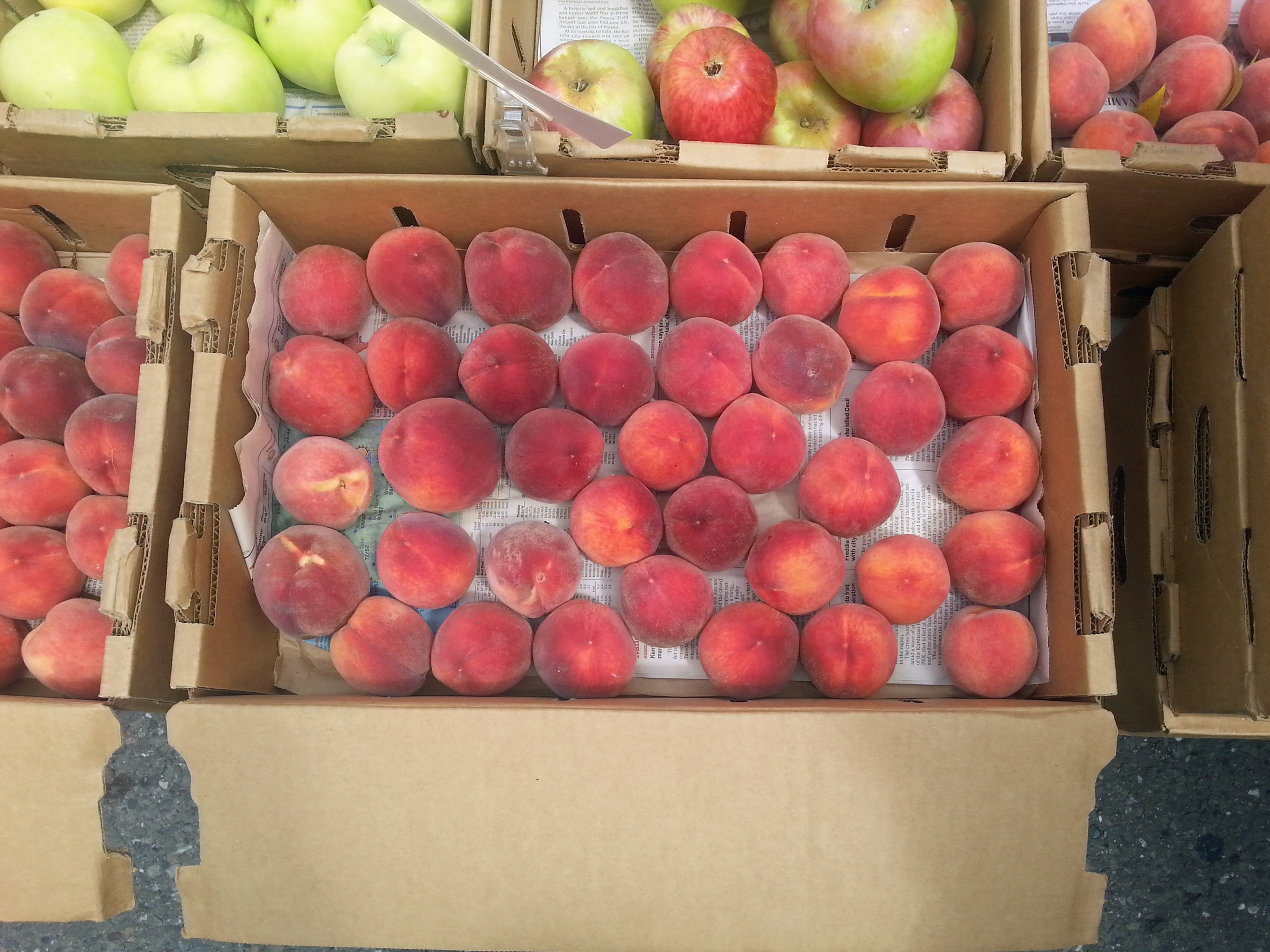
Fortuna Farmers' Market, 2016

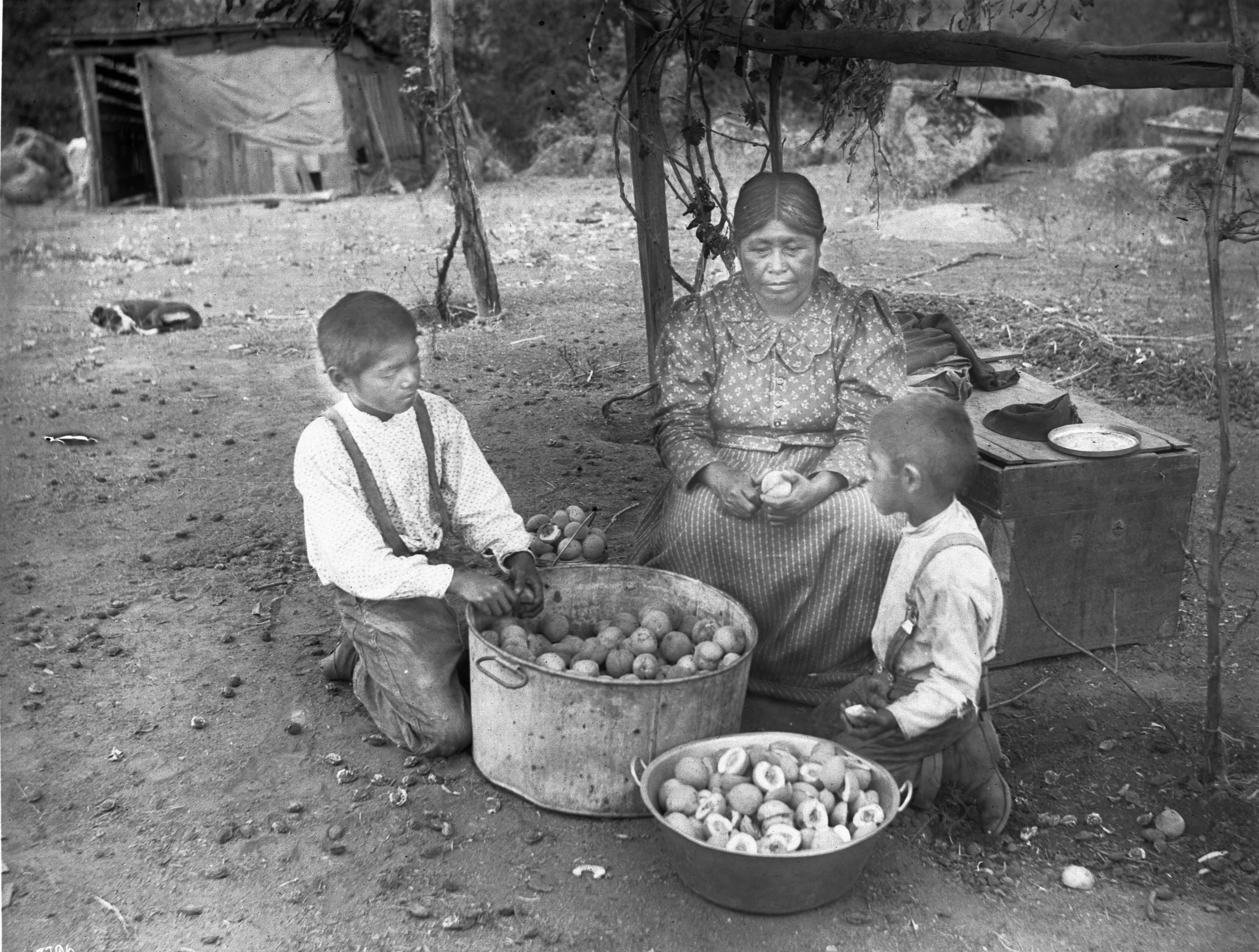
Yokuts, Tule River Reservation ~1900AD

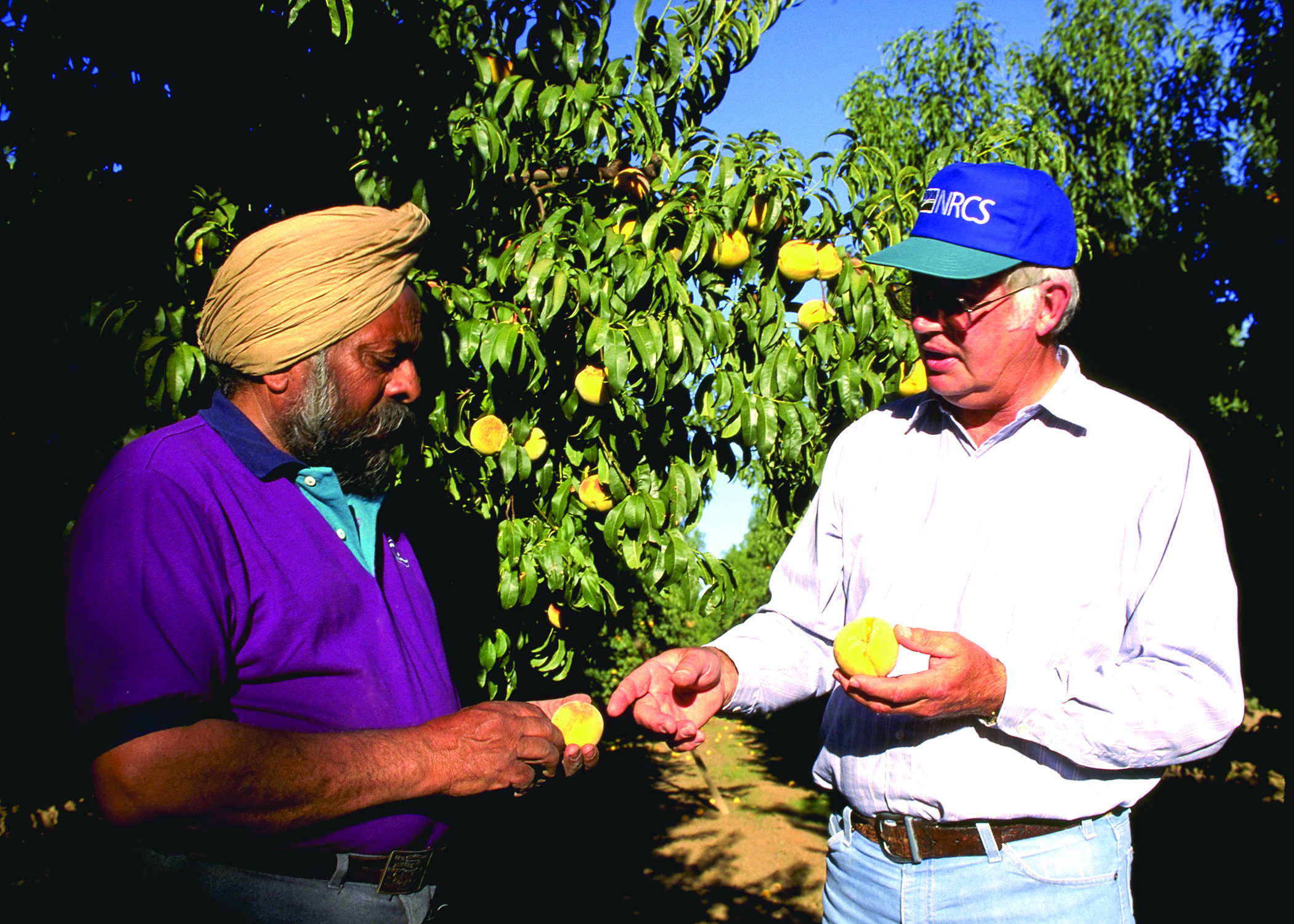
Yuba City

California produces roughly 70% of the peaches in the United States, making them the largest grower of any state.

The California Freestone Peach Association (CFPA) and California Canning Peach Association/California Cling Peach Board (CCPA) represent the industry. (Although the CFPA is a separate incorporation, it has always been operated by the CCPA's staff.) The overwhelming majority of the country's peaches are grown here, in 2020 468,000 short tons (425,000 t) for sales of $308.3 million. Since 1980 the total value of the harvest has been slightly increasing. The acreage (hectares) planted in peach has been declining however, down to 73,000 acres (30,000 ha) as of 2020.

As of 2021 cling deliveries for processing purposes have been on a downward trend for years. From 430,000 short tons (390,000 t) in 2010, delivered tonnage declined to 225,000 short tons (204,000 t) in 2021. Cling yield shows no clear trend over the same time, bouncing between 18.1 short tons per acre (41 t/ha) and 15.3 short tons per acre (34 t/ha).

Prices have been trending mostly upward, from $317 per short ton ($349/t) in 2012 to $518 per short ton ($571/t).

CCPA expects 2022 deliveries to be between 214,200–232,400 short tons (194,300–210,800 t) from a yield of 15.3–16.6 short tons per acre (34–37 t/ha).

UCD hosts one of the major breeding programs in the country. Most of the private breeding programs for peach in the country are found in California, with a significant amount of the public breeding also being performed here.

=== Pear ===
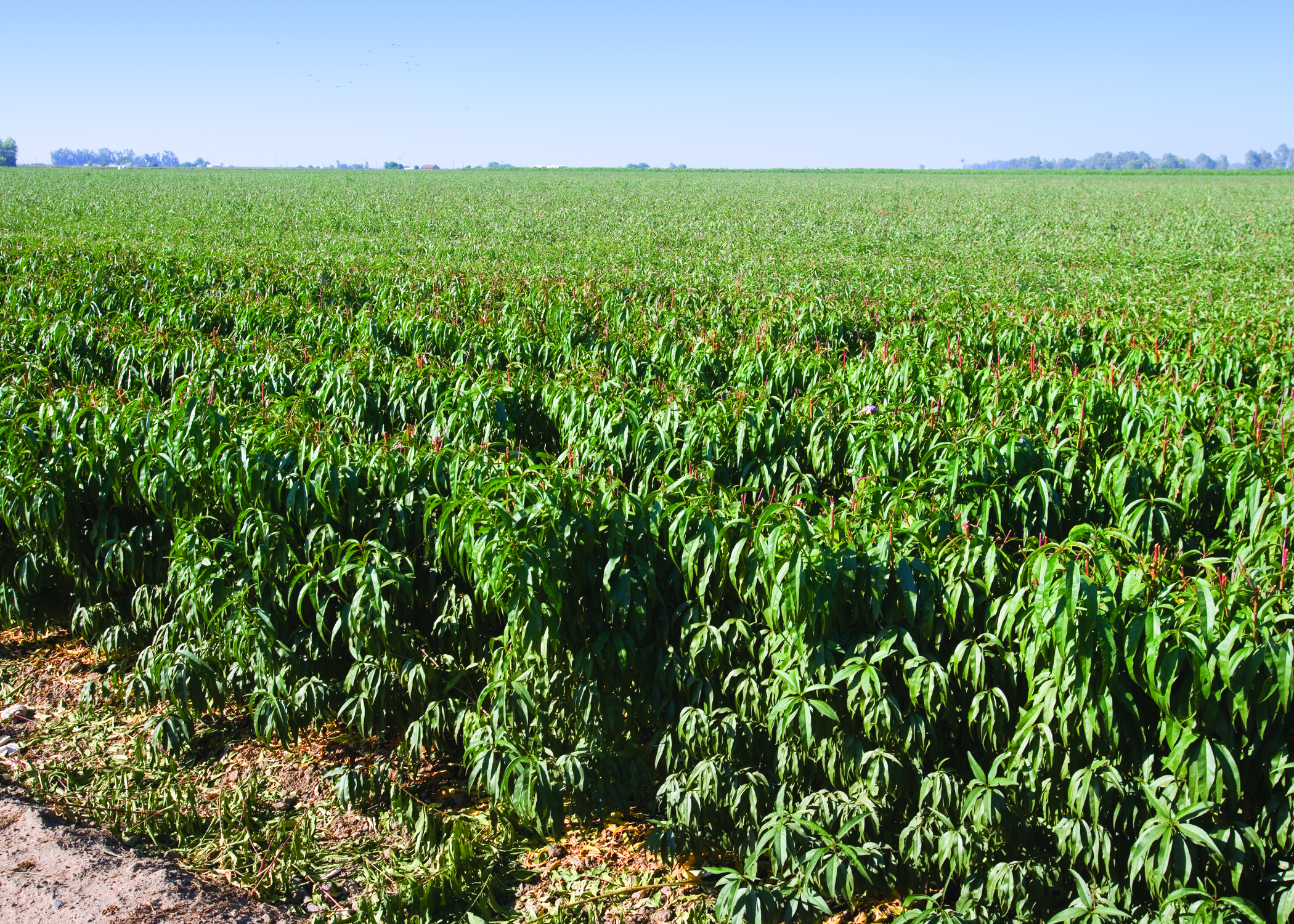
A field of growing pear trees

Pear cultivation is heavily pesticide-dependent. In the 1970s that put growers on the "pesticide treadmill" – increasing control costs, resistance, and resurgence of previously controlled adversaries. In response the orchards, the UC system, and Sacramento have put together IPM plans which have increased control and decreased applications. Fire Blight is a major concern as it is throughout the continent. Fire Blight is so severe that it largely determines what areas may be commercially successful in pear and which may not, restricted to geographies inhospitable to epidemics. Even so, antibacterials are necessary. Experts believe that major efficacy loss or a regulatory ban would effectively end Bartlett cultivation here, 55% of the country's pears.

UCR provides integrated pest management best practices through UCANR. Pear Psylla is one of the most serious of these pests, both due to its speed of insecticide resistance evolution and because it vectors the pear decline phytoplasma. The Asian pears P. serotina and P. ussuriensis have been widely used as rootstocks but are not being used in new plantings because their severe vulnerability to the decline phytoplasma. The California Pear Sawfly (Pristiphora abbreviata, not to be confused with the Pear Slug Caliroa cerasi) is a minor pest here and usually easily controlled. UC IPM recommends Entrust and Success (two Spinosad formulations).

Integrated pest management (IPM) has a long history of successful use in this crop.

=== Persimmon ===
California produces about 10,000 short tons or 9,100 tonnes of Fuyu persimmons per year, the majority of which are seedless. California and Florida account for most commercial persimmon production in the United States. Most persimmon orchards in the US are small scale, with 70% of them being under 1 acre or 0.5 hectares and 90% under 5 acres or 2 hectares).

=== Pistachios ===
Total pistachio acreage increased from 106,000 to 554,000 acres (43,000 to 224,000 ha) between 2002 and 2022 as the hardy trees can thrive with moderately salty water and soil, which is widespread in parts of the Central Valley.

Ferrisia gilli is an economically significant pest of pistachio here. F. gilli was formerly known as a California population of F. virgata, only being studied sufficiently to recognize that it is distinguishable from F. virgata due to its severe impact on pistachio and almond in this state. Jackrabbits, cottontails, and brush rabbits mostly damage pistachio trees when other food sources run out in winter or early spring. UC IPM recommends fencing, tree guards, baiting, shooting, repellents, and trapping.

Alternaria and Botryosphaeria dothidea are significant fungal diseases of pistachios here which often receive strobilurin, iprodione, azoxystrobin, and tebuconazole treatments. See § Alternaria and § Botryosphaeria dothidea.

=== Plums ===
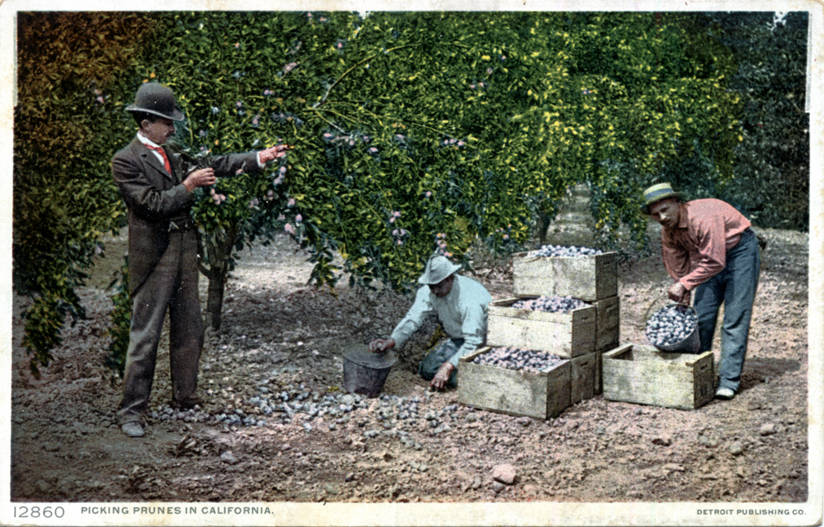
Prunes, 1900s

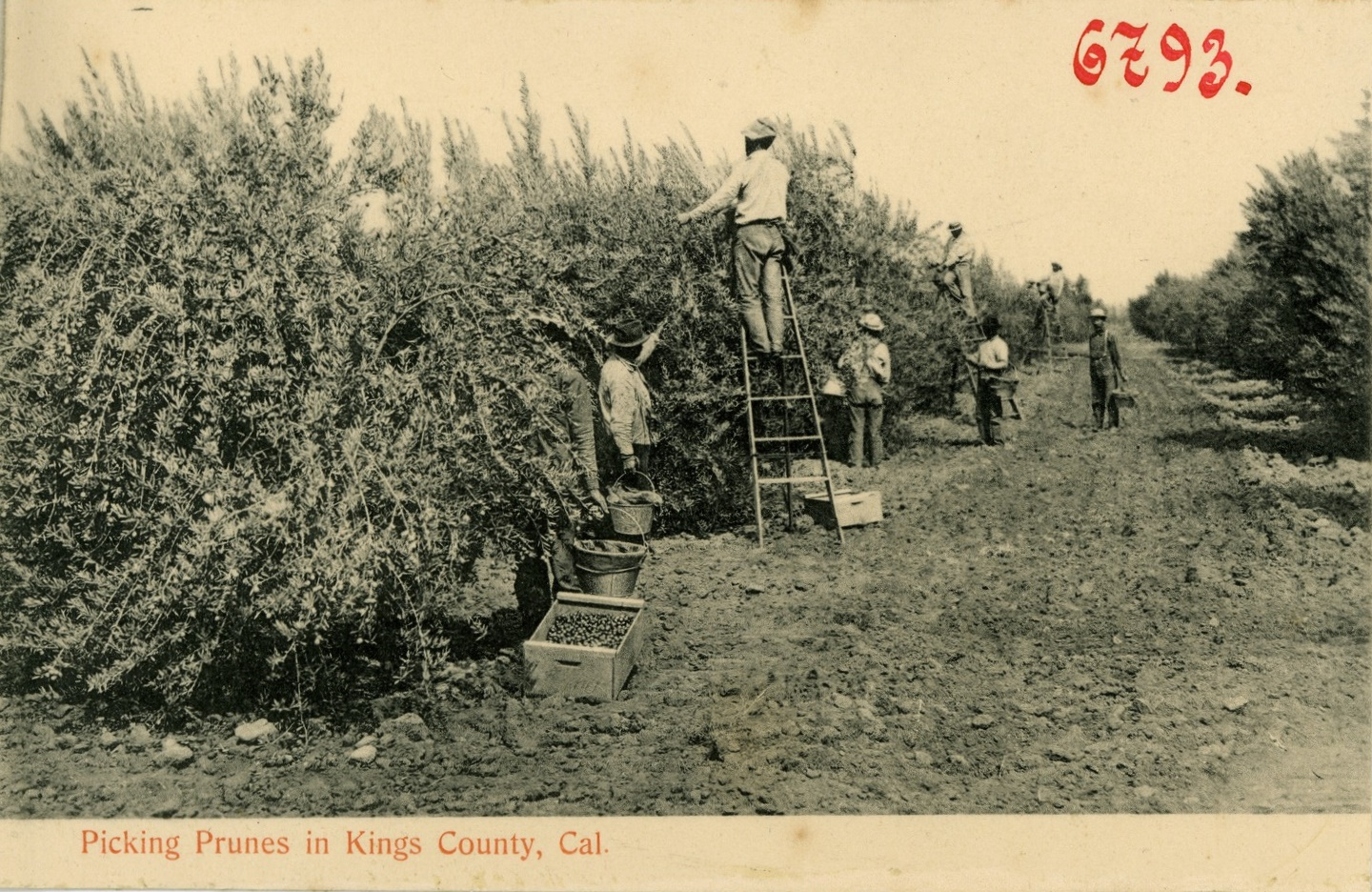
Kings County

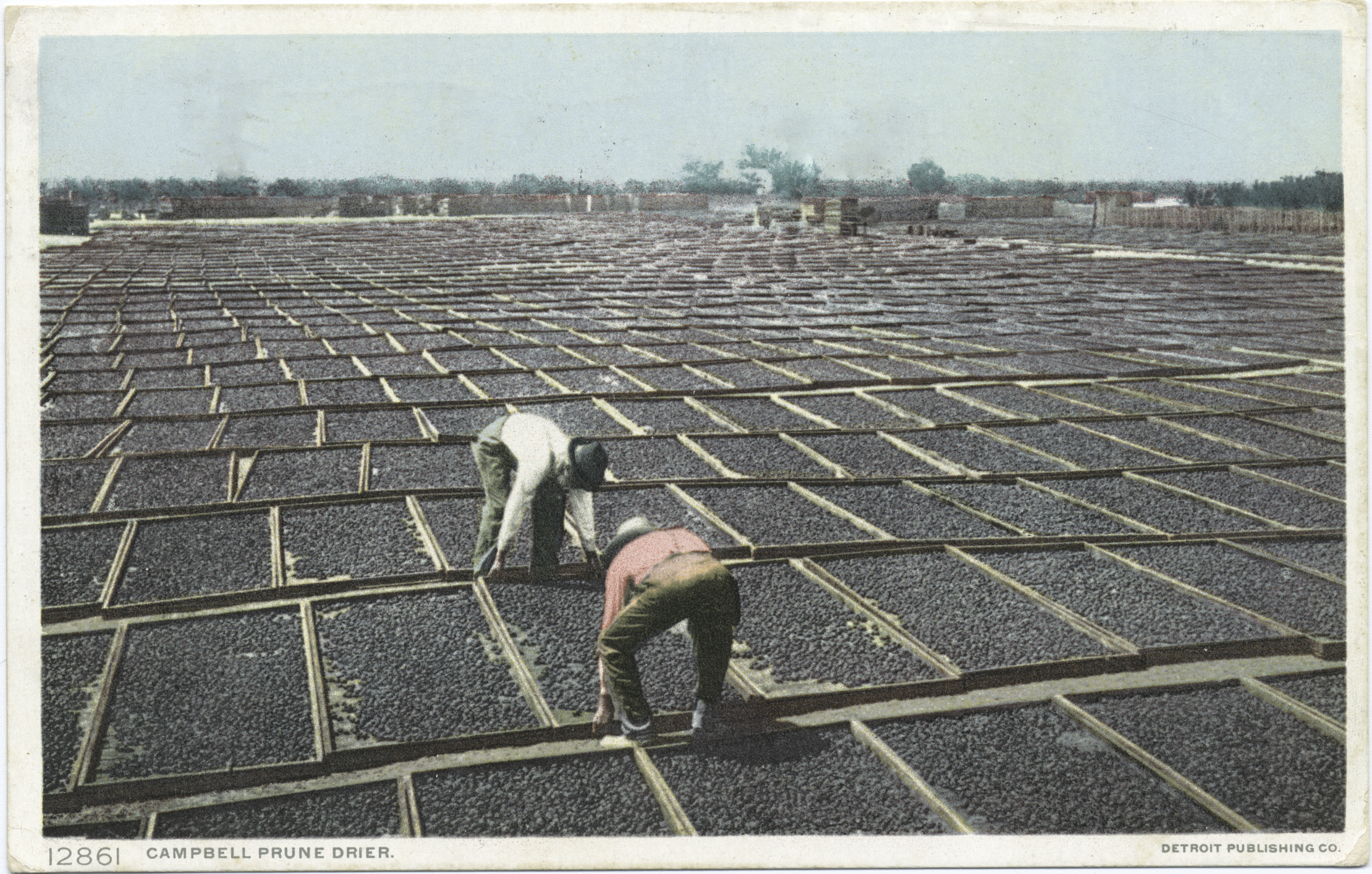
Drying prunes, 1908 or 1909

96% of the country's prunes and >70% of plums are grown here. Of that, >80% has come from the Sacramento Valley since the 1960s. For an invasive pest in the Bay Area, see § Plum Bud Gall Mite.

=== Pome ===
Pomes grown here include § Apple and § Pear. For a common disease see § Fire Blight.

=== Pomegranates ===
In pomegranate (Punica granatum), Black Heart (or "Heart Rot") is one of the most common diseases, as it is around the world. See § Black Heart.

Prunus

For Prunus spp. see § Stonefruit.

=== Raspberry ===
Over 80% of US raspberries (Rubus spp.) are grown in California. The country's consumption has increased eightfold between 2001 and 2021. This crop is 15% of the state's fresh berry sales. Acreage (number of hectares) before 2014 is unknown, but in that year 6,800 acres (2,800 ha) produced 1.4 million short hundredweight (64,000 t; 70,000 short tons) selling for $434 million, then the next year 9,700 acres (3,900 ha) produced 2 million short hundredweight (91,000 t; 100,000 short tons) worth $547 million, and in 2016 9,700 acres (3,900 ha) produced 2.1 million short hundredweight (95,000 metric tons; 100,000 short tons) for $358 million, worth more than the peach harvest and four times the pear harvest. The state has the opportunity to capture much of the market because as of 2021 most of the raspberry (55%), blackberry, and blueberry market in the country is imported, with Mexico supplying 98% of imported raspberry and they have probably reached their limit. California produces the most fresh market red raspberries, while Washington is highest for the processed market. Because the recent expansion has taken acres that had been pasture, pest and disease pressure is very small – making organic an easy option. The available acreage for that kind of conversion may have reached the limit as of 2021 however. Pre-transplant soil fumigation is necessary in conventional, making organic inviable if this kind of new(-to caneberry) acreage is not available. Driscoll's is the marketer of 90% of raspberries from California and Mexico sold into the US.

=== Rice ===
By 2006, California produced the second-largest rice crop in the United States, after Arkansas, with production concentrated in six counties north of Sacramento.

California's production is dominated by short- and medium-grain japonica varieties, including cultivars developed for the local climate such as Calrose, which makes up as much as 85% of the state's crop.

=== Small grains ===
UC ANR (University of California Division of Agriculture and Natural Resources) has a program specifically for small grains. UCANR provides pest management information and cultivation practices and organizes farmer education events. The small grains grown here are primarily wheat, barley, oats, and triticale, see § Barley and § Wheat. UC-IPM also produces publications specifically for pest management in these crops.

Although small grains are not a large part of the overall agricultural productivity of the state, they are important enough in particular locations for ANR to have Extension workers especially for San Diego County, Kings County, San Joaquin County, Siskiyou County, Lassen County, Sutter- and Yuba- and Colusa- Counties, Davis, Kern County, Woodland, Yolo County, Tulelake, Siskiyou, Tulare, and Sonoma.

Golden State Grains is an industry initiative which also cooperates extensively with the University of California breeding programs. GSG connects future farmers, present farmers, seed suppliers, processors, and consumers.

See § Wild beet for a weed of these crops.

=== Stonefruit ===
Stonefruits are crops of the genus Prunus. Largest harvests by weight are almond, apricot, cherry, peach and plum.

So much of North America's stonefruit is grown here that almost all available propagation material is adapted to California specifically. Few accessions are available which are appropriate anywhere else. Even so, these are particularly made for the previous situation in the state, in which lower densities prevailed and dwarfing rootstocks were not used. With increasing mechanization there is a need for such rootstocks.

=== Strawberries ===
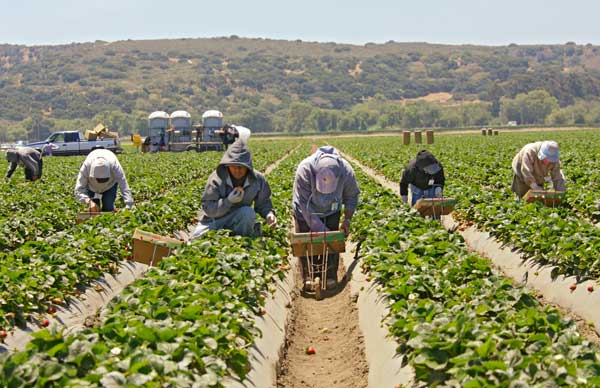
Strawberry field in Salinas

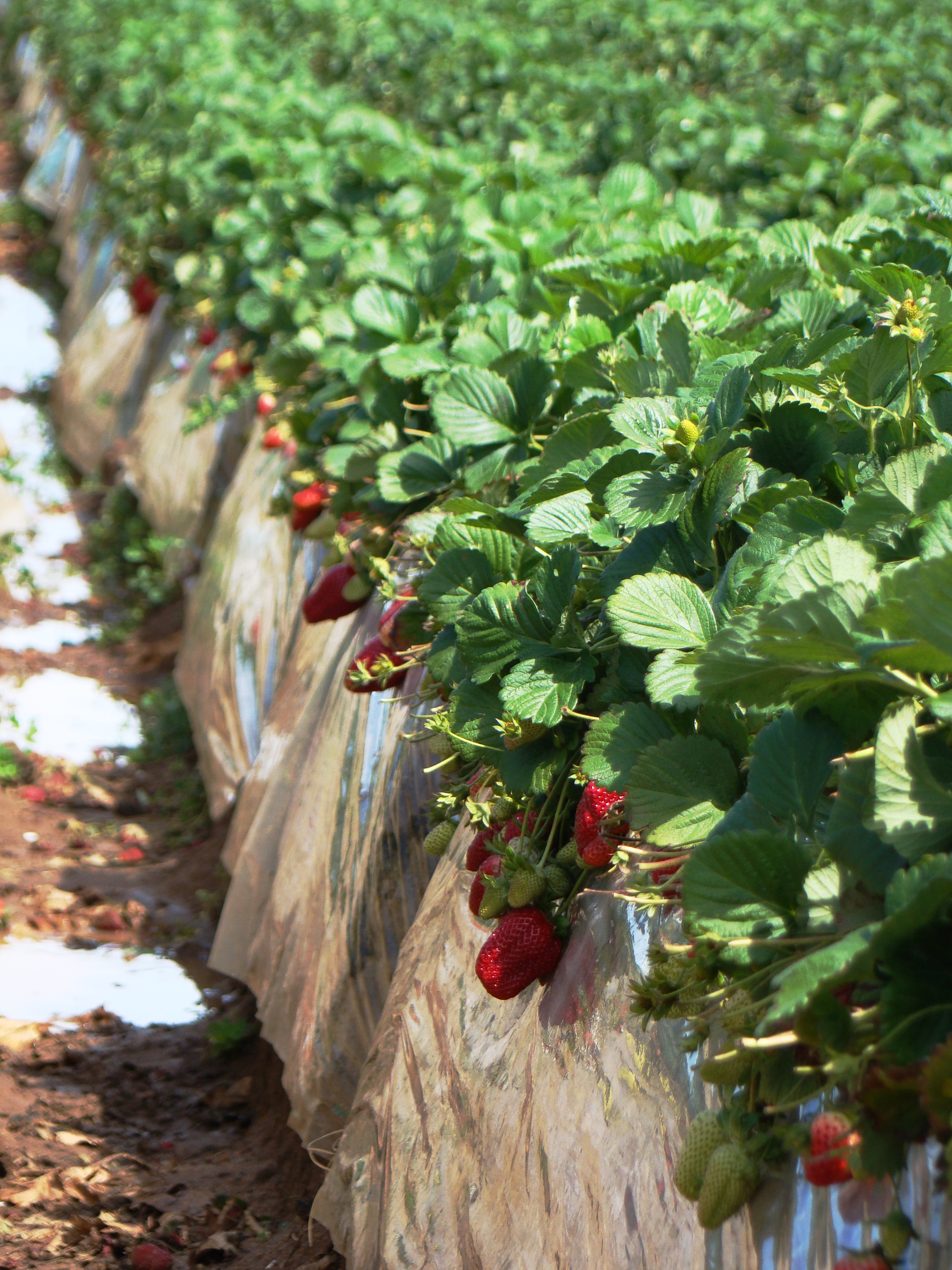
Strawberries in Carlsbad

Strawberries (Fragaria × ananassa) in the United States are almost entirely grown in California – 86% of fresh and 98% of frozen in 2017 – with Florida a distant second. The 2017 harvest was 1,461.2 thousand short tons (1,325.6 thousand metric tons) worth $3,100,215,000. Of that 30.0% was from Monterey, 28.6% from Ventura, 20.0% from Santa Barbara, 10.0% from San Luis Obispo, and 9.2% from Santa Cruz. The Watsonville/Salinas strawberry zone in Santa Cruz/Monterey, and the Oxnard zone in Ventura, contribute heavily to those concentrations.

Production has risen almost monotonically, from 2005 when 34,300 acres (13,900 ha) were harvested, yielding 600 short hundredweight per acre (67,000 kg/ha; 60,000 lb/acre), for a total yield of 20,580,000 short hundredweight (933,000 t; 1,029,000 short tons). The average price being $54.60 per short hundredweight ($1.204/kg; $0.5460/lb), the 2005 season's harvest sold for $1,122,834,000.

The California Strawberry Commission is the Agriculture Department body which advocates for strawberry growers. The CSC provides information for both growers and consumers. Some towns have annual strawberry festivals, see Strawberry festival § United States. The Driscoll's company began with strawberries here and still grows and sells here, and they have since expanded to other states, countries, and types of berries.

Cal Poly runs the Strawberry Center for both research, and producer education.

Labor costs have increased drastically since 2018 especially in this crop, see § Labor.

=== Timber ===
Almost 40% of the state is forest, 39.7 million acres (16.1 million hectares; 62,000 square miles; 161,000 square kilometres). Of that 16.7 million acres (6.8 million hectares; 26,100 square miles; 68,000 square kilometres) was maintained as timberland as of 1996 of which about 77% is softwood. Most lumber grown here is used here in the construction industry and some additional lumber is imported from nearby states and provinces.

=== Tomatoes ===
The Federal Risk Management Agency provides crop insurance for fresh market tomato here, through the regional office in Davis. 90% of FMT here comes from nine counties, San Joaquin County, Merced, Fresno, San Diego, Kern, Stanislaus, Kings, Tulare, and Sacramento. In 1999 44,000 acres (18,000 ha) were planted, yielding on average 12.5 short tons per acre (28 t/ha), for a gross dollar yield of $5,500 per acre ($14,000/ha).

Tomatoes contribute a mean of 1.77 $\ce{N2O-N}$ emissions pounds per acre (1.98 kg/ha) per year in Mediterranean agriculture systems.

Varieties used here widely incorporate Meloidogyne resistance.

=== Walnuts ===
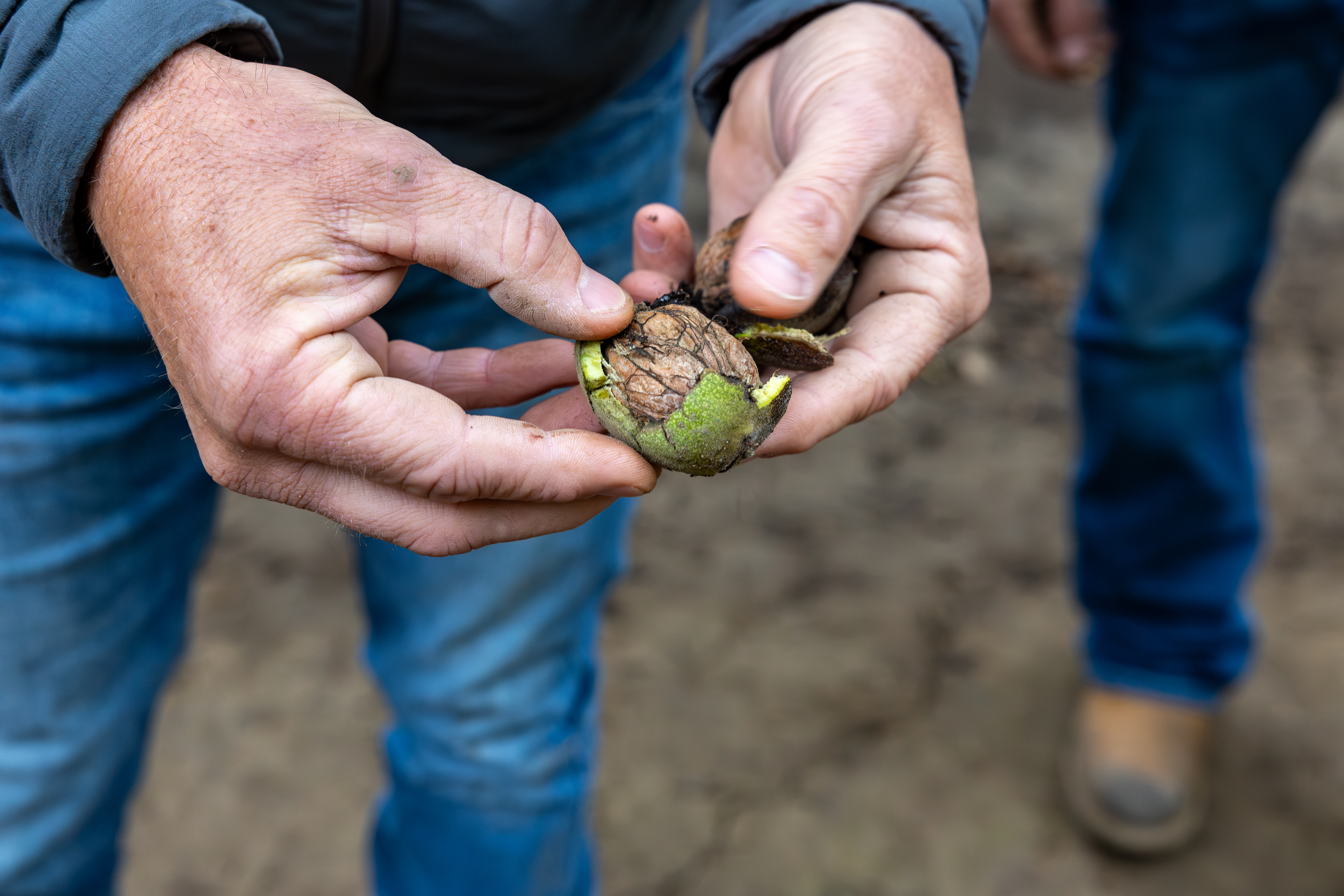
Chandler Walnut on a Glenn County farm close to the Sacramento River during harvest season 2023

California walnuts account for nearly all the walnuts grown in the United States. In 2017, walnut production was the seventh most valuable agricultural commodity in California, valued at $1.59 billion in cash receipts.

Walnuts contribute a mean of 1.34 $\ce{N2O-N}$ pounds per acre (1.50 kg/ha) emissions per year in Mediterranean agriculture systems.

=== Wheat ===
Wheat stripe rust is believed to have been present at or before the 1770s due to newspaper reports at the time, and due to the greater prevalence of stripe than leaf or stem. Hungerford (1923) and Hungerford & Owens (1923) found stripe on wheat here and almost all other western states.

As first speculated by Tollenaar & Houston 1967, in some years inoculum from the Sierra Nevadas initiates the state's epidemics. Wheat sown in the fall (autumn) in the valleys suffers from stripe rust carried from wild grasses in the mountains. This is not the only source however, as stripe will also overwinter in Sacramento Valley wheat cover. See § Stripe Rust.

=== Wine ===
California wine production has a rich viticulture history since the late 1700s when Spanish Jesuit missionaries planted Vitis vinifera vines native to the Mediterranean region in their established missions to produce wine for religious services. In the 1770s, Spanish missionaries continued the practice under the direction of Father Junípero Serra, who planted California's first vineyard at Mission San Juan Capistrano.

California wine production grew steadily after Prohibition, but was known mostly for its sweet, port-style and jug wine products. As the market favored French brands, California's table wine business grew modestly, but quickly gained international prominence at the Paris Wine Tasting of 1976, when renowned French oenophiles, in a blind tasting, ranked the California wines higher than the premier French labels in the Chardonnay (white) and Cabernet Sauvignon (red) categories. The result caused a 'shock' in viticulture industry since France was regarded as foremost producer of the world's finest table wines. This event contributed to expanding the recognition and prestige of vintners in the New World, specifically, the "Golden State".

The state produces about ninety percent of the American wine supply and is the fourth largest wine producer among the world's independent nations. California has more than 4,200 wineries ranging from home-grown and small boutiques to large corporations with international distribution, and even more vineyards and growers, at close to 6,000. Wine Country, in Northern California, is an internationally recognized premier wine-growing region.

== Livestock ==
=== Red meat ===
In 2022, California meat production exceeded 181 million pounds of beef, 49 million pounds of pork, and 3 million pounds of mutton. Harris Ranch a ranch and feedlot operation is California's largest beef producer, producing 150 million pounds (68 kt) of beef per year in 2010.

=== Fowl ===
In 2024, California's 8,864,000 egg-laying chickens produced 201 million eggs, 2.2% of the US total, while leading states Ohio and Iowa each produced over 1 billion eggs.

The domestic fowl industry suffers from avian malaria. Chickens (Gallus gallus/G. domesticus) and ducks (Anas platyrhynchos domesticus) are commonly infected, as well as various wild birds. Testing has been done since the Herman group made the first reports of P. relictum infection, in Herman 1951, Herman et al., 1954, and Reeves et al., 1954. (See § Avian malaria and § Plasmodium relictum for the parasite and vectors, and for testing.)

== Regions ==
=== Central Valley ===
The Central Valley of California is one of the world's most productive agricultural regions. More than 230 crops are grown there. On less than one percent of the total farmland in the United States, the Central Valley produces eight percent of the nation's agricultural output by value: US$43.5 billion in 2013. The top four counties in agricultural sales (2007 data) in the U.S. are in California's Central Valley: Fresno ($3.731 billion), Tulare ($3.335 billion), Kern ($3.204 billion), and Merced ($2.330 billion).

Its agricultural productivity relies on irrigation both from surface water diversions and from groundwater pumping (wells). About one-sixth of the irrigated land in the U.S. is in the Central Valley. Central Valley groundwater pollution is an ongoing environmental issue in the area.

There are 6,000 almond growers who produced more than 1.8 million tonnes in 2013, about 60 percent of the world's supply.

Parts of the Valley are quarantine as of July 2022 due to an ongoing pest eradication. The Peach Fruit Fly was found in Chowchilla and this is a threat not only here, but could spread to the entire state, and to a lesser degree the entire country and other locations around the world. See § Peach Fruit Fly.

=== Salinas Valley ===
The Salinas Valley, located within Monterey County, is one of the most productive agricultural regions in California. Monterey County grows over 50% of the national production for leaf lettuce, head lettuce, and celery. It also produces significant percentages of the country's broccoli, spinach, cauliflower, and strawberries. The area is also a significant producer of organic produce, with 68,868 acres in cultivation and annual sales of $412,347,000.

== Organic farming ==
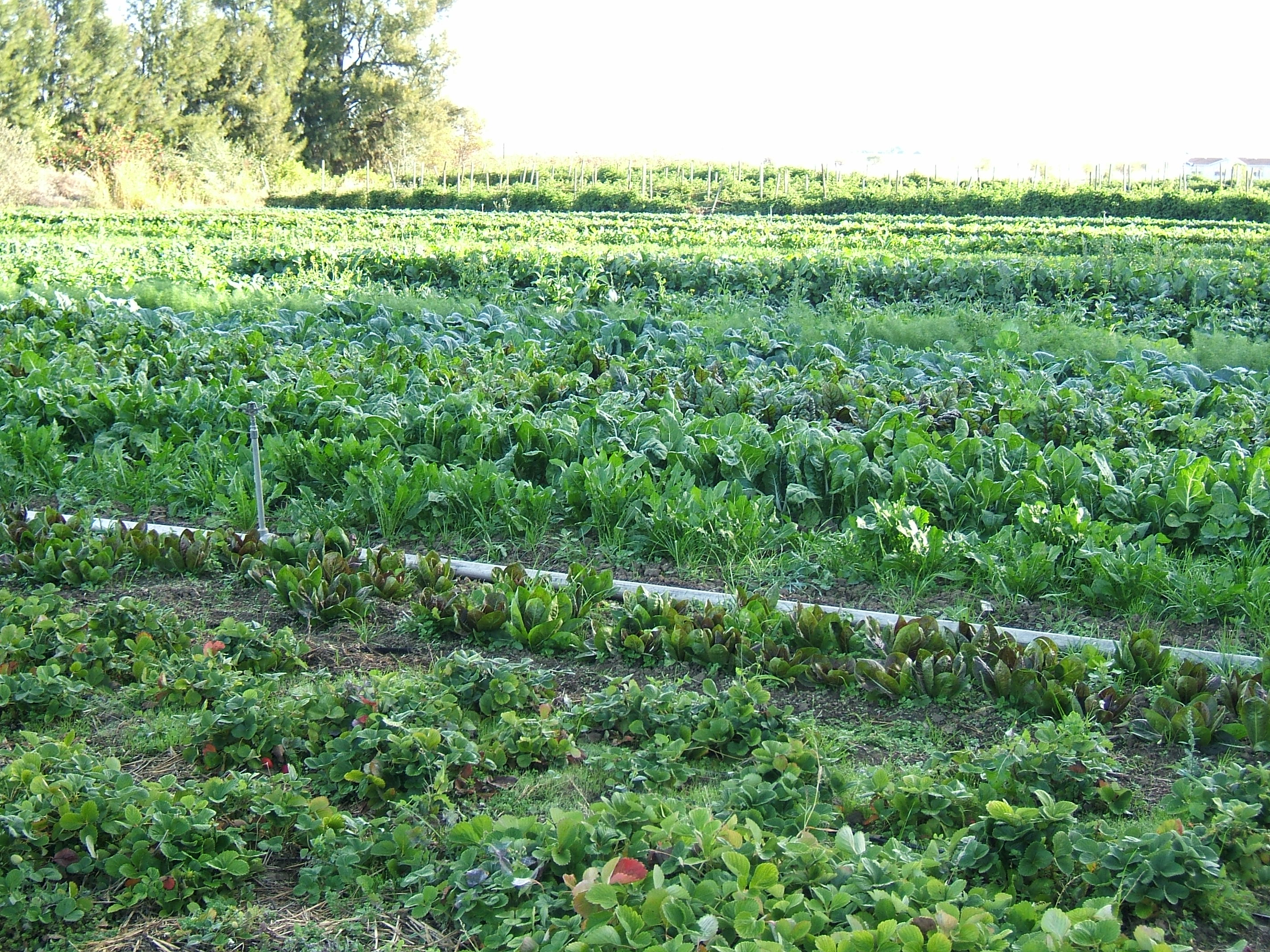
Organic cultivation of mixed vegetables in Capay, California

California has more certified organic farms than any other state. In 2016, more than a million acres in the state were certified organic. CA grows 90% or more of the U.S. production of Organic almonds, artichokes, avocados, broccoli, cauliflower, celery, dates, figs, grapes, strawberries, lemons, lettuce, plums, and walnuts.

There are two primary laws that regulate organic production: at a federal level, the Organic Foods Production Act of 1990 and at a state level, the California Organic Food and Farming Act of 2016. Both laws lay out standards for production, processing, handling and retailing that must be followed in order to label a product as "organic". The USDA, California Organic Products Advisory Committee, and the California County Agricultural Commissioners monitor and ensure these standards are followed by administering enforcement actions for any violations.

Any agricultural operation selling more than $5,000 in products per year is required to acquire organic certification, if they seek to sell their products under the organic label. Multiple organizations are accredited to certify operations organic.

== Environmental and natural resources ==
=== Water use ===
The largest overall water users in California are the environment, agriculture and urban/ municipal uses. In an average year, about 40% of California's water consumption, or approximately 34.1 million acre-foot (42,100 million cubic metres), is used for agricultural purposes. However, the exact proportion of total water usage for agriculture varies widely between 'wet' and 'dry' years. In wet years, agriculture is responsible for closer to 30% of total water consumption and in dry years closer to 60%. Water for agriculture is used to irrigate more than 9 million acres (36,000 square kilometres) of cropland annually.

Water for agriculture comes from two primary sources: surface water and groundwater. Surface waters include natural bodies of water along with a network of human-built reservoirs with aqueducts and canals that carry water from the source to the agricultural users. Groundwater aquifers range in depth and accessibility across the state, and historically have been used to supplement surface water supplies in dry years.

California is one of the top five states in water use for livestock. Water withdrawals for livestock use in California were 101–250 million US gallons (380,000,000–950,000,000 L)/day in 2010.

Saudi Arabian companies and individuals have bought land here and in Arizona to benefit from subsidized water. This has produced criticism because the hay grown is exported to Saudi Arabia. Around 15% of overall alfalfa production goes to exports.

=== Water quality ===
Agricultural impacts on water quality concentrate around concerns of the following contaminants: nutrients, pesticides, salts, pollutants, sediment, pathogens, and heavy metals. These contaminants enter water bodies through above-ground surface runoff of rainwater or excess irrigation water, or percolating through the soil and leaching into groundwater. Water quality concerns affect most regions of the state and tend to be exacerbated during periods of drought.

At present, all irrigated agricultural operations in the State are required to participate in the Irrigated Lands Regulatory Program. The regulatory program began after the California Legislature passed Senate Bill 390 (SB390) in 1990, that eliminated a blanket waiver for agricultural operations to discharge wastewater without any specific environmental standards.

=== Water supply ===
A major source for Southern California's water supply, both agricultural and urban, is the Colorado River from which an aqueduct has been built to transport the water from the river to Riverside. Colorado River irrigation is essential for agriculture to the Salton Sea Basin, which supports key agriculturally productive areas such as the Imperial Valley. Another aspect of the agricultural water supply in California is the transfer of water that takes place from northern to southern California. In northern California, the Shasta Dam contains the flow of the Sacramento River, preserving water for California's use, and pumping stations in the California Delta extract water transferring that water across the San Joaquin Valley and southward. A key component to the distribution of the water supply are the irrigation districts and water agencies who are responsible for delegating water as to meet the demand of those within the area as well as clarify and legal arbitration as to water rights.

The agency tasked with overseeing the state's water supply and any projects associated with the upkeep of the supply is the California Department of Water Resources (CDWR). As part of the 2019-2020 California Spending Plan, the CDWR received $2.336 billion with $833 million going towards projects overseen by the California Natural Resources Agency and $1.503 billion going towards the control board supervised by the California Environmental Protection Agency. One of the CDWR's major projects is the State Water Project (SWP) which distributes 34% of the water that flows through its various channels. The SWP also is one of the largest suppliers of hydroelectric power in the state.

The invasive quagga- and zebra-mussels reached the state in about 2006 and threaten the already limited supply of farm water. The mussels have continued to spread and present an ever-expanding threat to pipelines.

=== Air pollution ===
In 2014, California agriculture soils contributed to 51% of statewide greenhouse gas emissions. California's Mediterranean climate supports irrigation events such as nitrification which encourage nitrous oxide production. Mean nitrous oxide emissions (the biggest contributor to ozone depletion of all the major agricultural greenhouse gases) have been reported to be "four times higher in irrigated compared to rain-fed systems". Another factor which frequently contributes to increased $\ce{N2O}$ emissions are warm soil temperatures (a common occurrence in California).

== History ==
=== Pre-1850 ===
Some California hunter-gatherer tribes, including the Owens Valley Paiute, developed irrigation. Native Californians were skilled at gathering materials from plants at all times of the year, allowing the consistent gathering of materials from any and all local plants. Depending on when various plants—including succulents, flowers, and trees—bloomed or became ripe, different aspects of the plant could be accessed or harvested by Native California peoples.

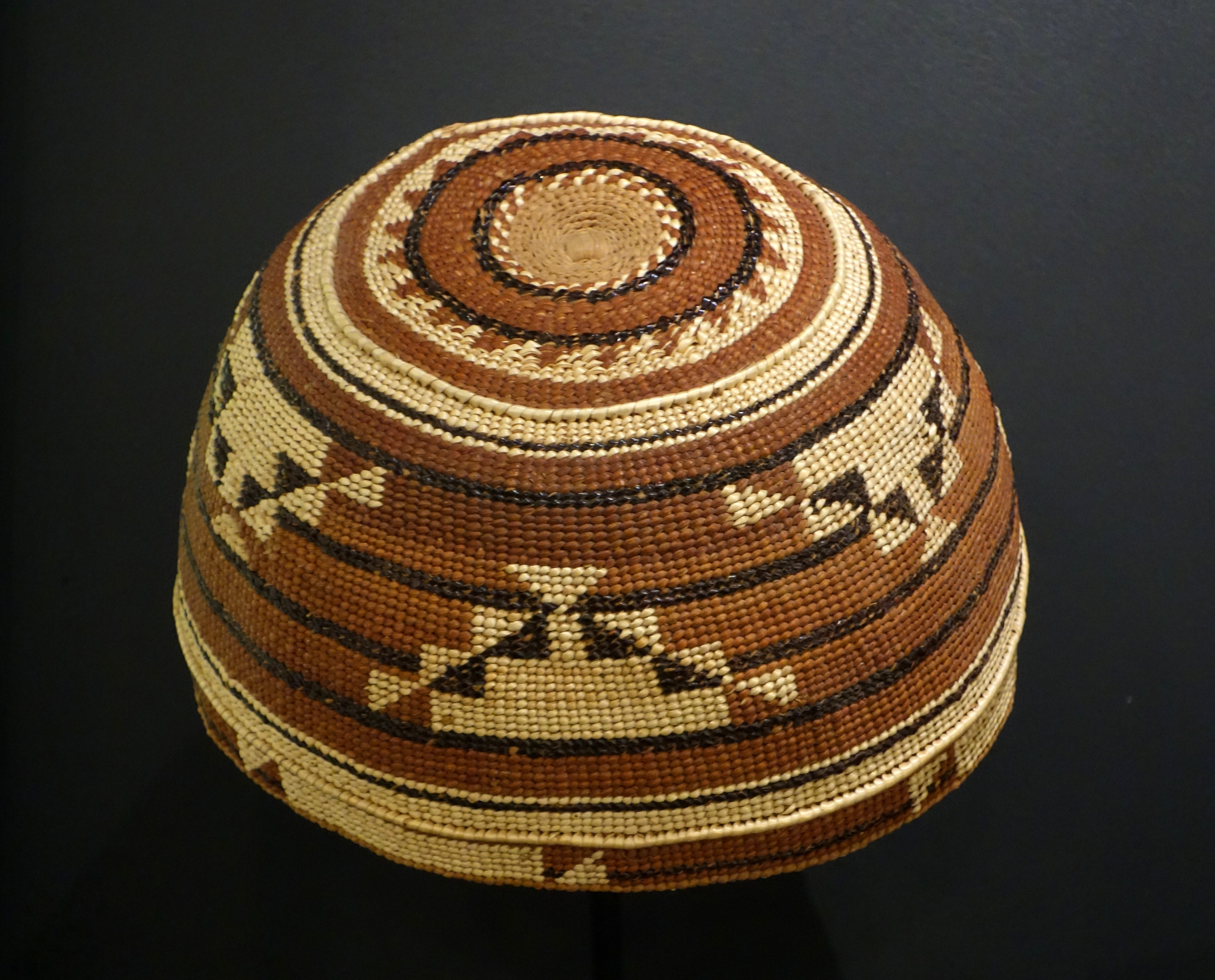
A basket cap made by the Karuk, Yurok, or Hupa peoples, using stems of plants that would have been harvested as a result of cultural burning.

Black oak acorn harvests were increased by cultural burning, which stimulated acorn growth and increased biodiversity in the area. Cultural burning was commonly practiced by throughout California to maintain a healthy landscape that produced quality resources, as the Karuk, Yurok, Hupa peoples all regularly burned areas of bear grass and California hazelnut and to encourage the growth of stronger stems that could be used for basketry.

In the late 1700s, Franciscan missionaries established Spanish missions in California. Like earlier Spanish missions established in Baja California, these missions were surrounded by agricultural land, growing crops from Europe and the Americas, and raising animals originating from Europe. Indigenous workers from Baja California made up a large part of the initial labor force on California missions. In the early 1800s, this flow of laborers from Baja California had largely stopped, and the missions relied on converts from local tribes. By 1806, over 20,000 Mission Indians were "attached" to the California missions. As missions were expected to become largely self-sufficient, farming was a critically important Mission industry. George Vancouver visited Mission San Buenaventura in 1793 and noted the wide variety of crops grown: apples, pears, plums, figs, oranges, grapes, peaches, pomegranates, plantain, banana, coconut, sugar cane, indigo, various herbs, and prickly pear. Livestock was raised for meat, wool, leather, and tallow, and for cultivating the land. In 1832, at the height of their prosperity, the missions collectively owned over 150,000 cattle and over 120,000 sheep. They also raised horses, goats, and pigs.

The Spanish (1784–1810) and Mexican (1819–1846) governments made a large number of land grants to private individuals from 1785 to 1846. These ranchos included land taken from the missions following government-imposed secularization in 1833, after which the missions' productivity declined significantly. The ranchos were focused on cattle, and hides and tallow were their main products. There was no market for large quantities of beef (before refrigeration and railroads) until the California Gold Rush.

=== 1850–1900 ===
Rapid population growth drove an increase in importation of agricultural products, and, within a few years, a massive growth in in-state agriculture. In the first years of the gold rush, the state relied on agricultural imports arriving by ship, from Australia, Chile, and Hawaii. During these years, there was rapid growth in vegetable farming for local markets. This was followed by an expansion of grain farming. A shift in the economic dominance of grain farming over cattle raising was marked by the passage of the California "No-Fence Law" of 1874. This repealed the Trespass Act of 1850, which had required farmers to protect their planted fields from free-ranging cattle. The repeal of the Trespass Act required that ranchers fence stock in, rather than farmers fencing cattle out. The ranchers were faced with either the high expense of fencing large grazing tracts or selling their cattle at ruinous prices.

Irrigation was almost nonexistent in California in 1850, but by 1899, 12 percent of the state's improved farmland was irrigated.

Luther Burbank moved to Santa Rosa, California in 1875, and developed numerous commercially successful varieties of plants over the next 50 years.

=== 1900–1950 ===
The 1902 Newlands Reclamation Act funded irrigation projects on arid lands in 20 states including California.

In 1905, the California legislature passed the University Farm Bill, which called for the establishment of a farm school for the University of California (at the time, Berkeley was the sole campus of the university). The commission took a year to select a site for the campus, a tiny town then known as Davisville. UC Davis opened its doors as the "University Farm" to 40 degree students (all male) from UC Berkeley in January 1909.

In 1919, the California Department of Food and Agriculture was established. The department covers state food safety, state protection from invasive species, and promoting the state's agricultural industry.

The Dust Bowl of the 1930s drove many people from the American prairie, and a significant number of these economic migrants relocated to California. Poor migrants from Oklahoma and nearby states were sometimes referred to as Okies, generally a pejorative term. In 1933, the state saw a number of agricultural labor strikes, with the largest actions against cotton growers. Cherry, grape, peach, pear, sugar beet, and tomato workers were also involved.

In 1942, the United States began the Bracero program. Lasting until 1964, this agreement established decent living conditions and a minimum wage for Mexican workers in the United States.

=== 1950–2000 ===
In 1965, the Williamson Act became law, providing property tax relief to owners of California farmland and open-space land in exchange for agreement that the land will not be developed.

The 1960s and 1970s saw major farm worker strikes including the 1965 Delano grape strike and the 1970 Salad Bowl strike. In 1975, the California Agricultural Labor Relations Act of 1975 was enacted, establishing the right to collective bargaining for farmworkers in California, a first in U.S. history. Individuals with prominent roles in farm worker organizing in this period include Cesar Chavez, Dolores Huerta, Larry Itliong, and Philip Vera Cruz.

Through 1995 there were 50,000 Mixtecs every year in California agriculture. They were usually not the only indigenous Mexican ethnic groups – Zapotecs and Mayans were also usually working the same jobs.

=== 2001–present ===
In the 2000s and 2010s, Californians voted for propositions which established new protections for farm animals. 2008 California Proposition 2 and 2018 California Proposition 12 both established minimum requirements for farming egg-laying hens, breeding pigs, and calves raised for veal. Few veal and pig factory farm operations exist in California, so these propositions mostly affect farmers who raise California's 15 million egg-laying hens.

== Agricultural crime ==
California nut crimes have involved the theft of millions of dollars of nuts (almonds, pistachios, cashews and pecans) in multiple incidents since 2013.

Water theft for agriculture has been an issue in times of drought, with the State assessing fines up to $1.5 million.

== Pests ==
Despite its expansive geography, some pests are so severe, so polyphagous, and/or so wide-ranging as to be economically significant to the entire state.

In 2022, 181 million pounds of pesticide were applied in California, treating 92 million cumulative acres. The most used pesticides include sulfur, mineral oils, glyphosate, 1,3-dichloropropene, Lambda-cyhalothrin, Chloropicrin, and Abamectin.

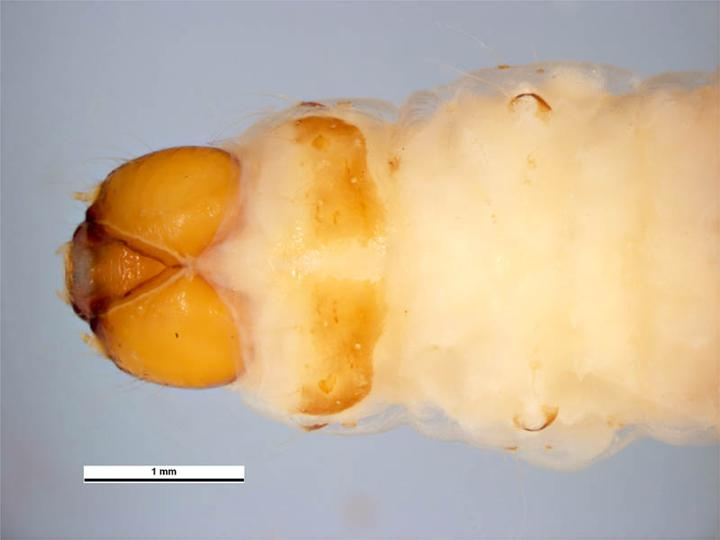

The Navel orangeworm (Amyelois transitella) first entered from Arizona in 1942 and quickly began attacking walnut, date palm, and fig – despite its common name it is only a minor pest of citrus. In the decades since it has become a notorious pest of almond, pistachio, and pomegranate and remains problematic for walnut and fig as well.

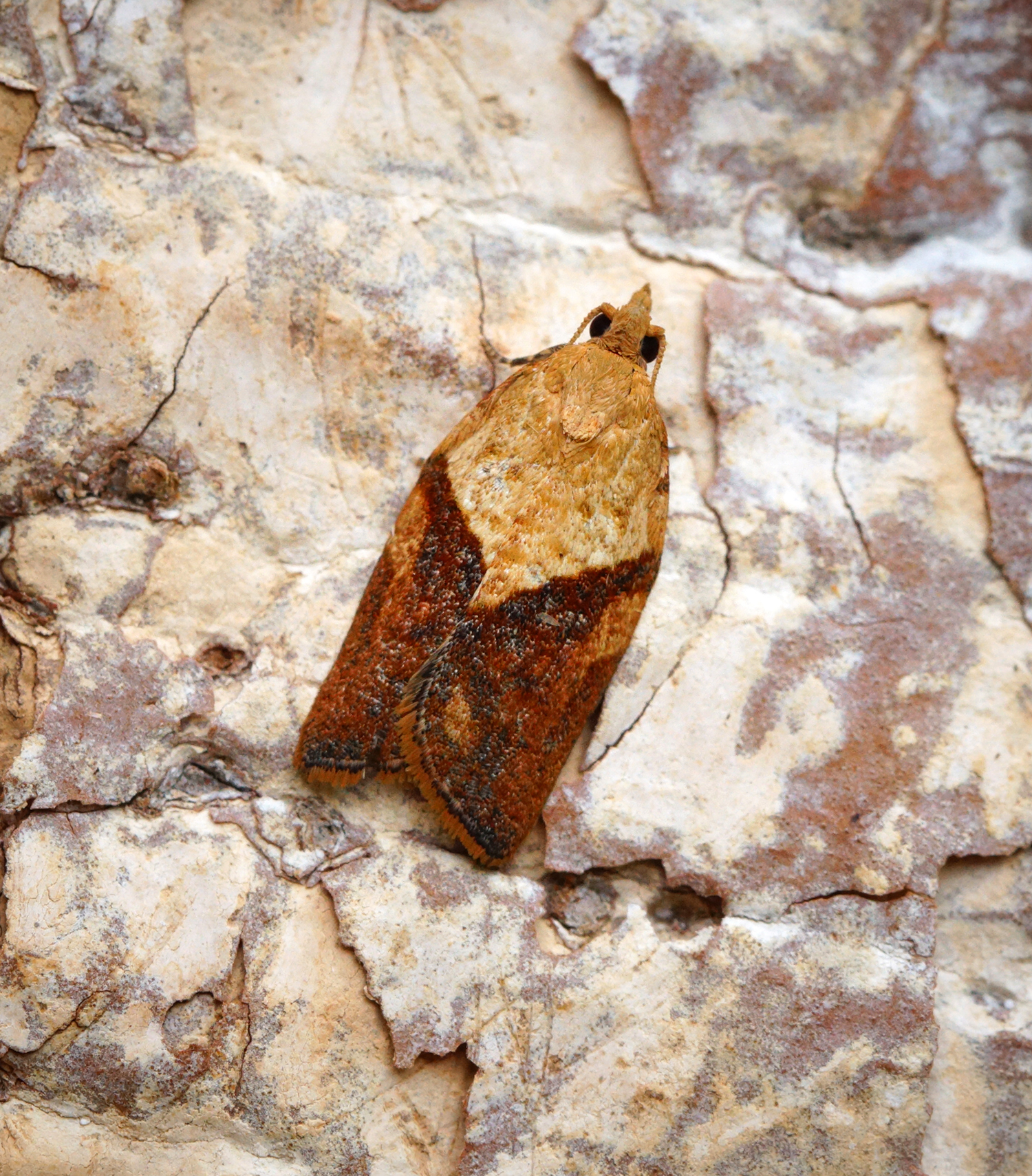

The light brown apple moth (Epiphyas postvittana, often abbreviated to LBAM) is a leafroller moth. Despite its common name it is a pest of a wide range of crops, not just apples,. The moth was confirmed to be present in California in 2007, and spraying programs in 2007–2008 lead to the Light brown apple moth controversy. Tavener et al., 2011 finds novaluron works well but only when carried by horticultural mineral oil. Hosts include strawberry.

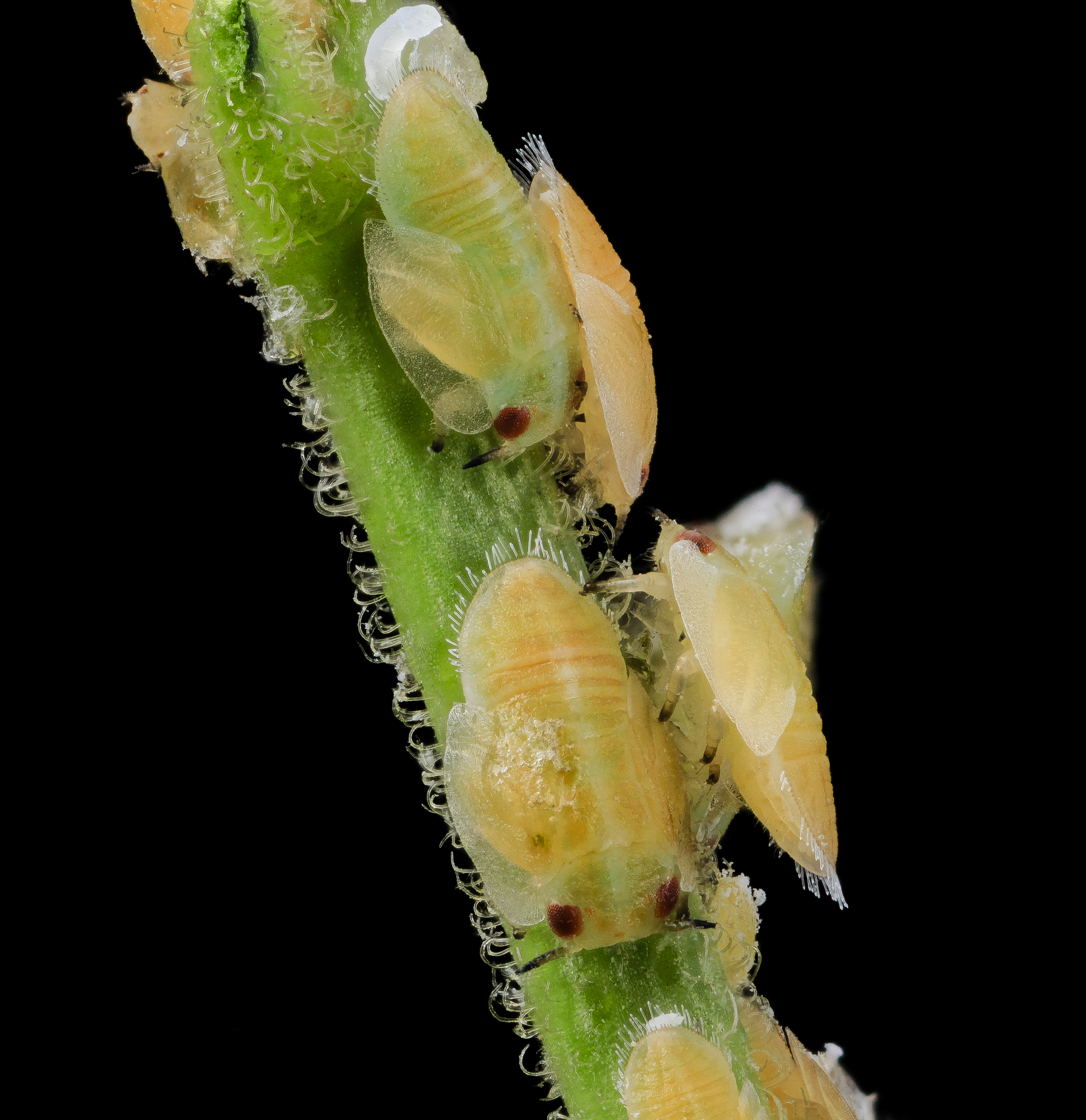

Asian citrus psyllids (Diaphorina citri) are a major invasive threat to citrus.

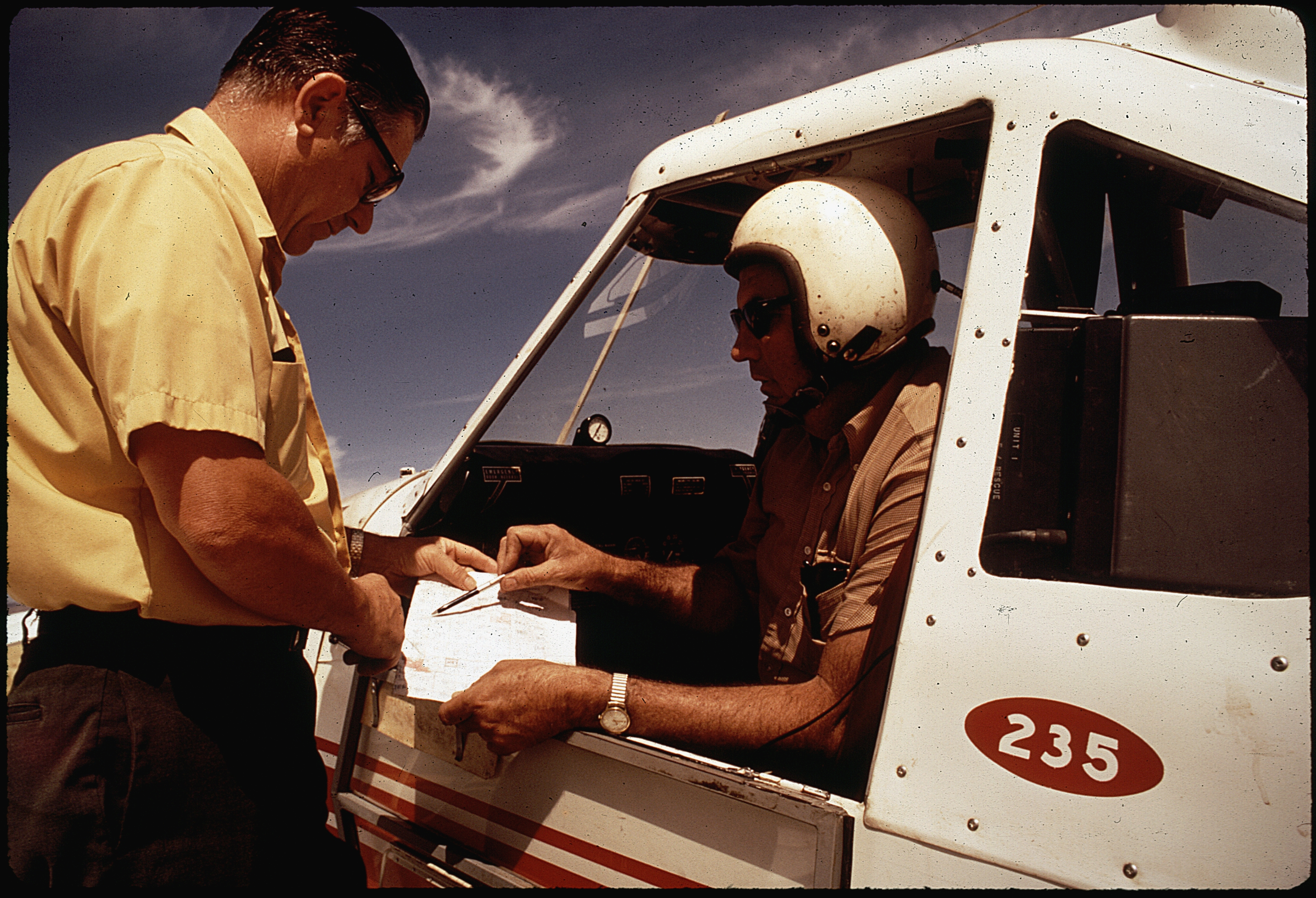
Just before dropping rodenticide into a field, Fresno County

Sellers et al. finds rodents and lagomorphs (jackrabbits, hares, other rabbits) do not seem to be a pest of walnut orchards here. On the other hand, jackrabbits, cottontails, and brush rabbits are a problem for pistachios. The lagomorph biocontrol myxoma virus is epidemiologically endemic in native lagomorphs.

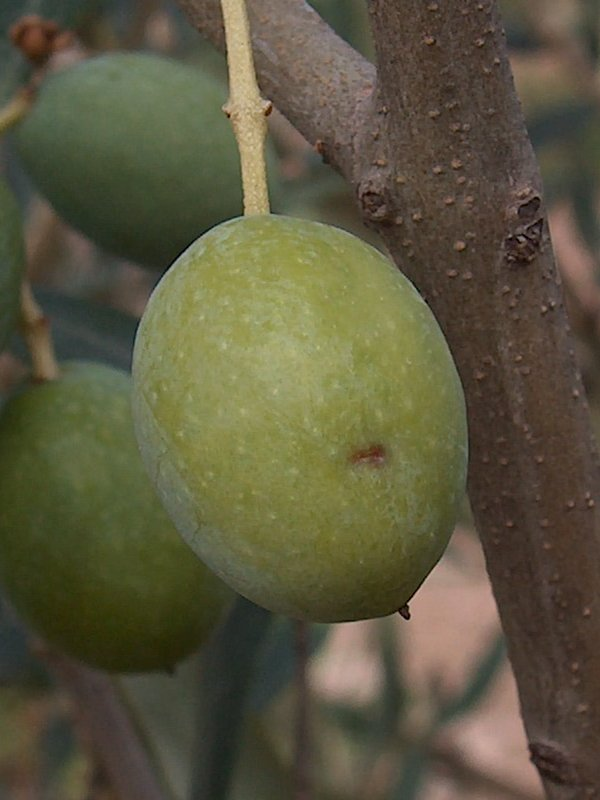

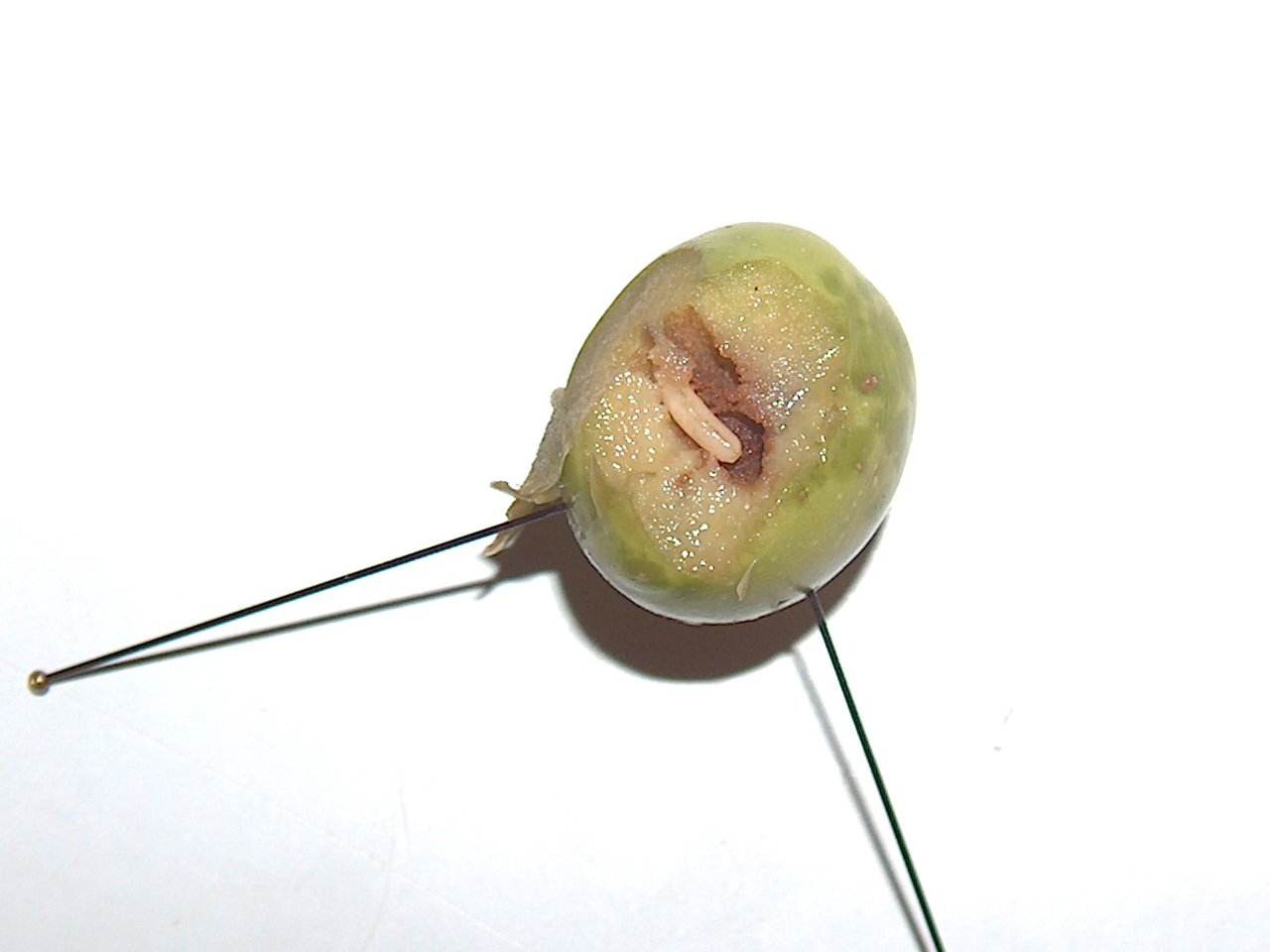

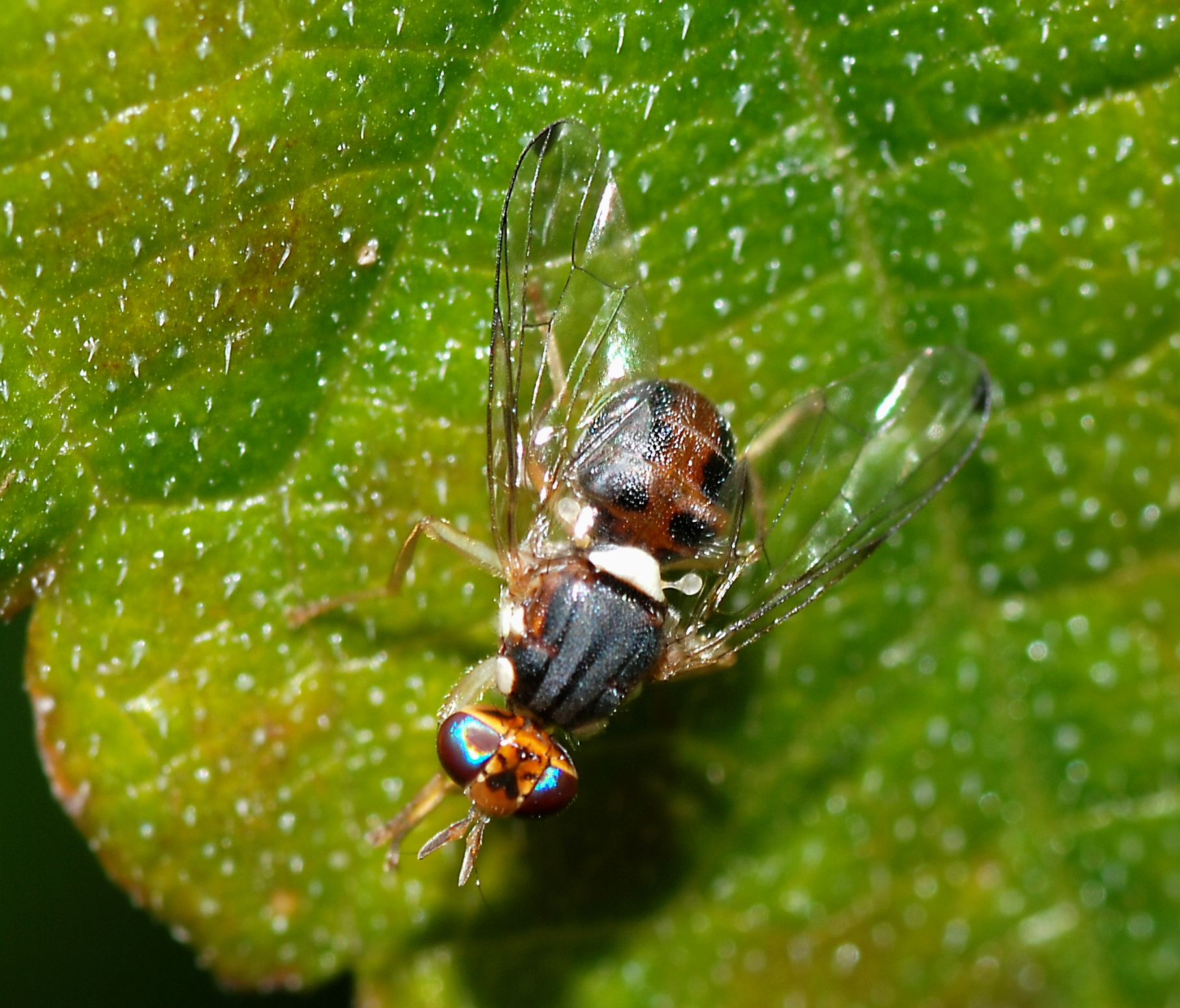

Olives throughout the state suffer from the introduced Olive Fruit Fly (Bactrocera oleae) here. First detected outside its traditional Old World co-occurrence with the host tree in Los Angeles County in November 1998, it has since spread throughout California and into Baja and Sonora. OFF is native to the Mediterranean basin and appears in some of the earliest written documents of human history, and is now found throughout much of the world.

Particular strains of OFF are associated with particular varieties here. Burrack & Zalom 2008 find females have strong oviposition preferences for particular varieties and their offspring show better life history performance on those preferred varieties. The introduction here has spurred much parasitoid research, hoping to control them with biological controls. Daane et al., 2008, Sime et al., 2006, Sime et al., 2007, Yokohama et al., 2006, and Yokohama et al., 2008 all were undertaken to serve this state's need for parasitoids. Yokohama et al., 2008 achieves 60% control in cage trials using a Psyttalia cf. concolor. Daane et al., 2008 finds P. lounsburyi is especially specific to OFF over other possible hosts, and its selectivity makes it an attractive option. Daane et al. 2009 discloses an undescribed Pteromalus sp. nr. myopitae first found here. Overall there is much concern about offtarget impacts if these were to be released.

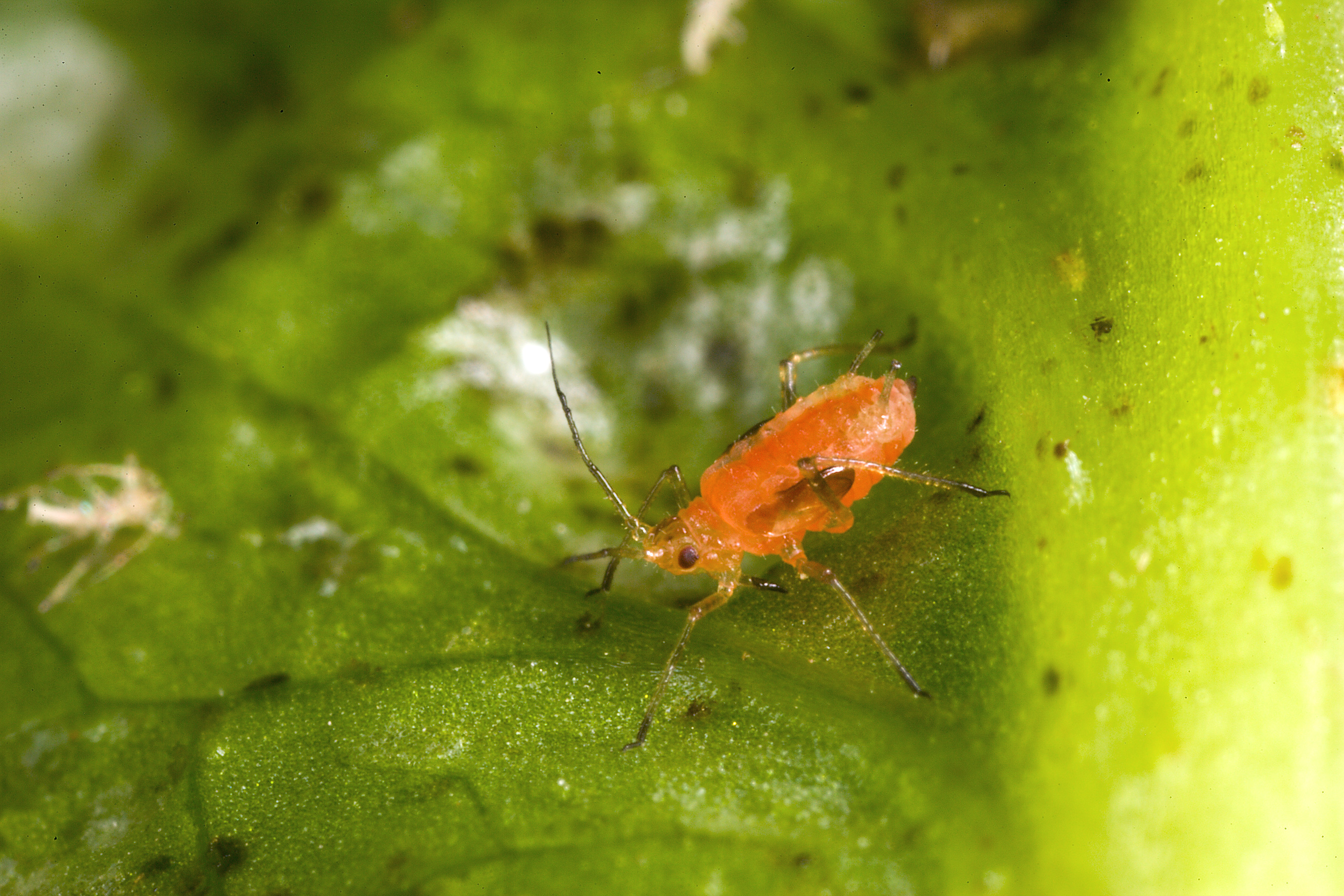

Aphid are common crop pests here. Nasonovia ribisnigri is one of the most common, especially for lettuce.

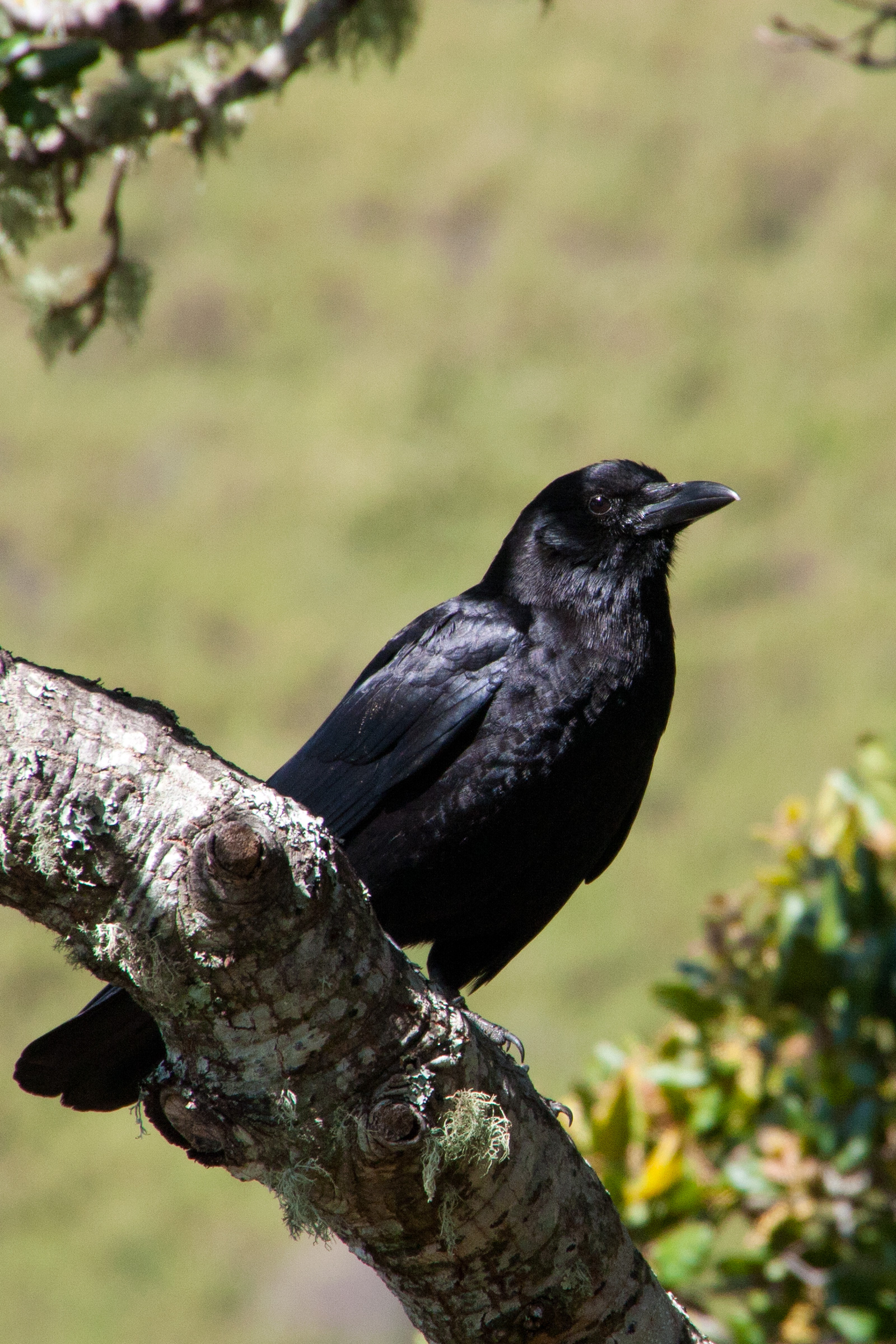

Birds are often pests in fruit cultivation here, especially in cherries. In cherry orchards the most common are crows (Corvus brachyrhynchos), crowned sparrows: (Zonotrichia spp.), European starlings (Sturnus vulgaris), house finches (Carpodacus mexicanus), house sparrows (Passer domesticus), scrub-jays (Aphelocoma californica), and Yellow-billed magpies (Pica nuttalli), but also in apple, blueberry, and grape, and the American Robin is a problem for some of these.

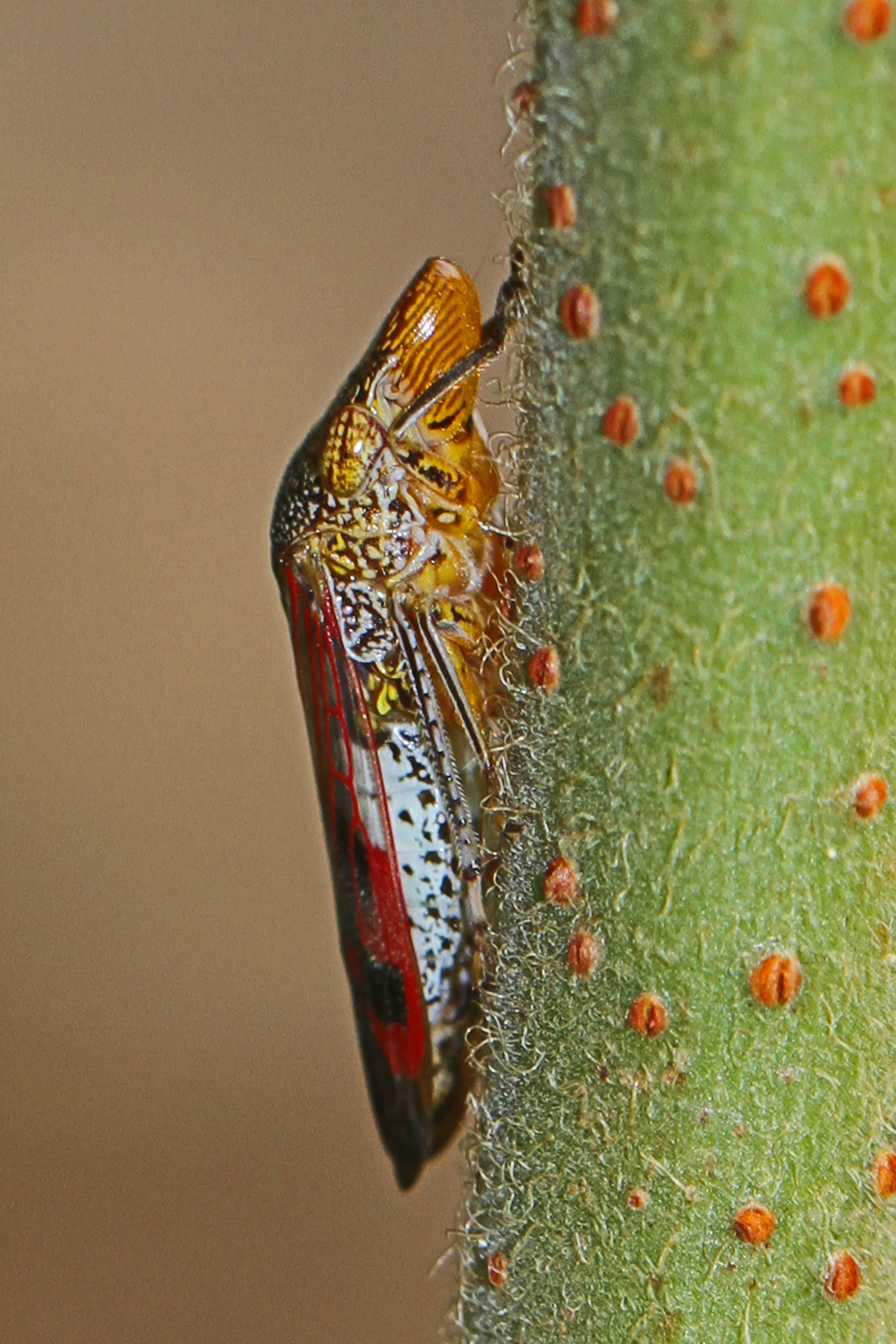

The Glassy-Winged Sharpshooter (GWSS, Homalodisca vitripennis, syn. H. coagulata) is a vector of Pierce's Disease and other Xylella fastidiosa diseases here. Probably present since the late 1980s, the GWSS was only confirmed here in 1994. GWSS was not obviously a threat until August 1999 when it vectored PD to over 300 acres (120 ha) of vineyard in Temecula, Riverside County, forcing its destruction. GWSS was first detected in Solano in November 2021, and although as of July 2022 absent from adjacent Napa is considered a high risk for introduction. The staff of the Napa County Agriculture Commissioner does inspections of all material entering the county to prevent that from happening. GWSS is such a problem in Fresno that there are permanent quarantine, monitoring, and eradication activities there.

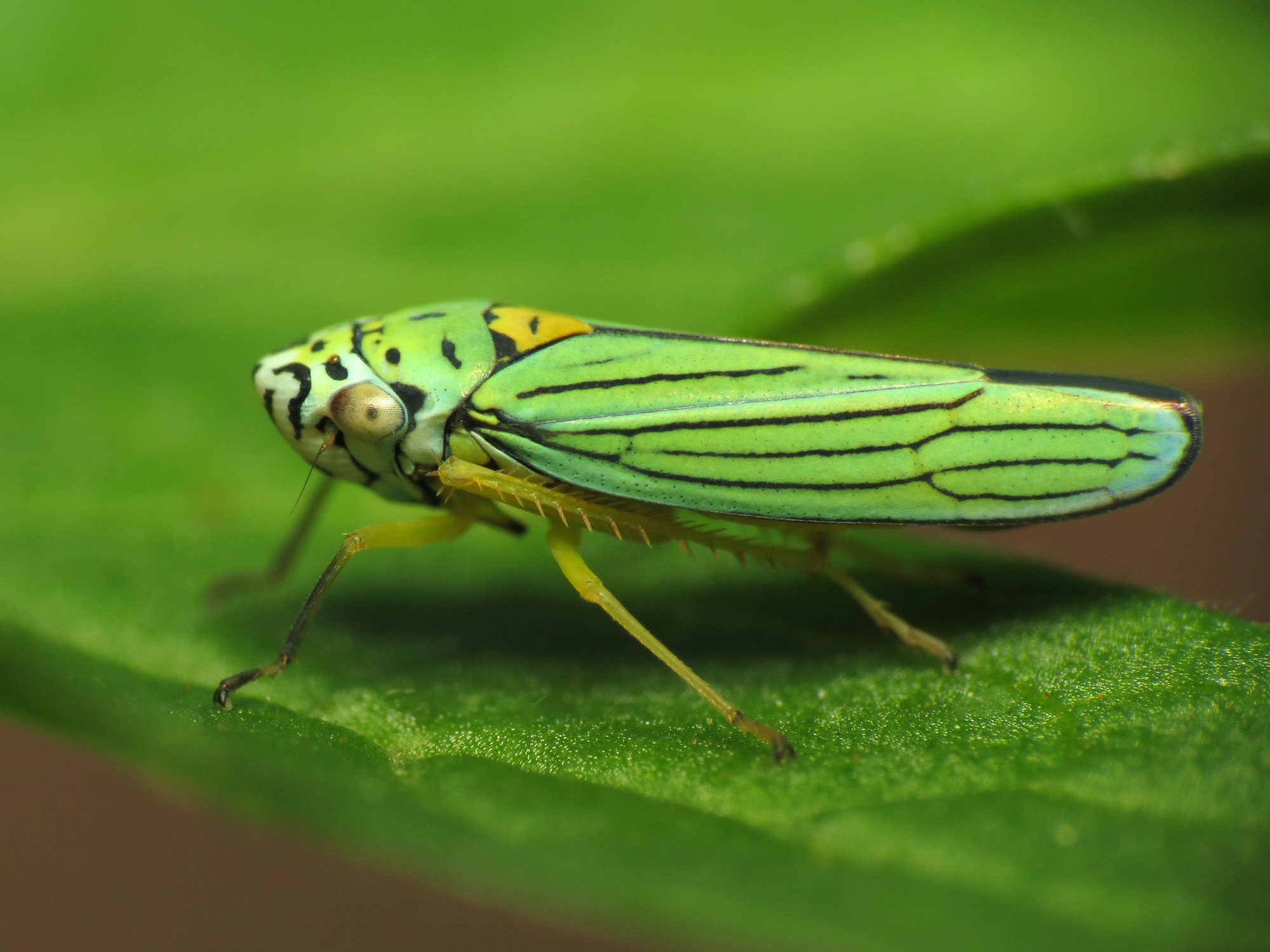

In 1997 the Blue-Green Sharpshooter (BGSS, Graphocephala atropunctata, the primary PD vector) arrived here and the two have combined badly ever since. Besides vectoring PD they are also themselves a sucking pest and Hewitt et al., 1949 found they will often additionally go through reproduction on the vines.

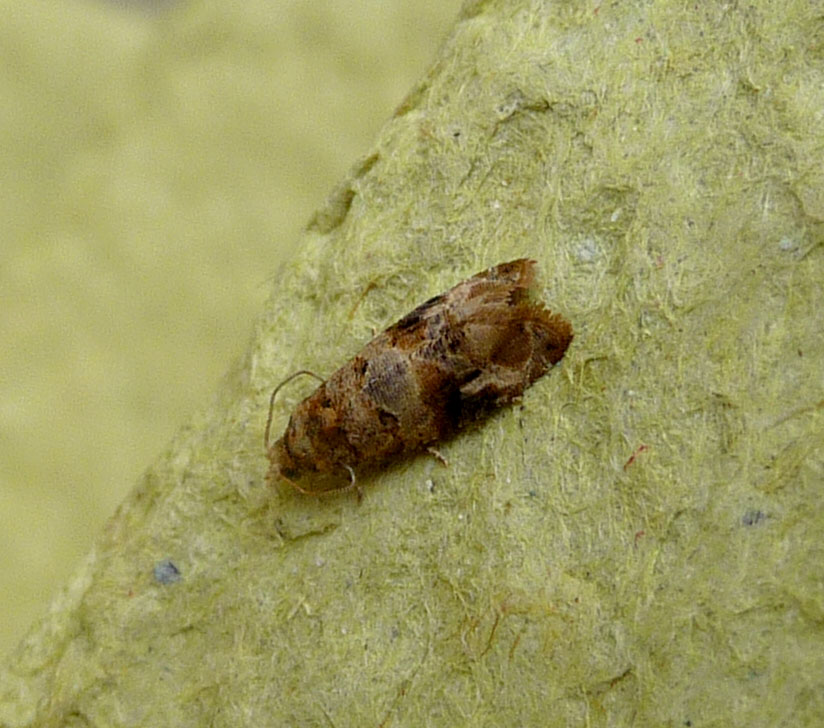

The European Grapevine Moth (Lobesia botrana, EGVM) was present from at least 2009 through 2014. A 10 acres (4.0 ha) block in Napa suffered a 100% crop loss in 2009 due to a burrowing worm. This was confirmed to be the EGVM by Gilligan et al., on September 30, 2009 (published in 2011). (It is native to southern Italy and may have arrived elsewhere in the state, possibly being detected as early as 2007 by Mastro et al., and published in 2010). Both USDA and CDFA impose quarantines if two moths are found within 3 miles (4.8 km) of each other within one lifecycle span. At first the quarantine zone was 5 miles (8.0 km) around the detection sites. In 2010, 40,000 traps revealed an expanded presence – in Fresno, Mendocino, Merced, Monterey, Napa, San Joaquin, Santa Clara, Santa Cruz, Solano, and Sonoma. The first detection in Sonoma was around Kenwood on March 29, 2010, then a total of 59 across the County that year. In 2011 only nine were detected on two sites in Sonoma, and despite the quarantine the pest spread to Nevada County in 2011. The quarantine was lifted in Fresno, Mendocino, Merced, and San Joaquin in February 2012, only one insect was found in Sonoma for the year, the quarantine was lifted in Nevada, Santa Clara, and Santa Cruz counties in December, and was greatly shrunk in Solano and Sonoma in the same month. No detections occurred in Sonoma in 2013. The quarantine was lifted in Solano in 2014 but one EGVM was found in Sonoma for the year and so the quarantine remained in Napa and Sonoma. The last detection being in June 2014 in Sonoma, all USDA and state quarantine and trapping activities ended with the declaration in August 2016 of a successful eradication.

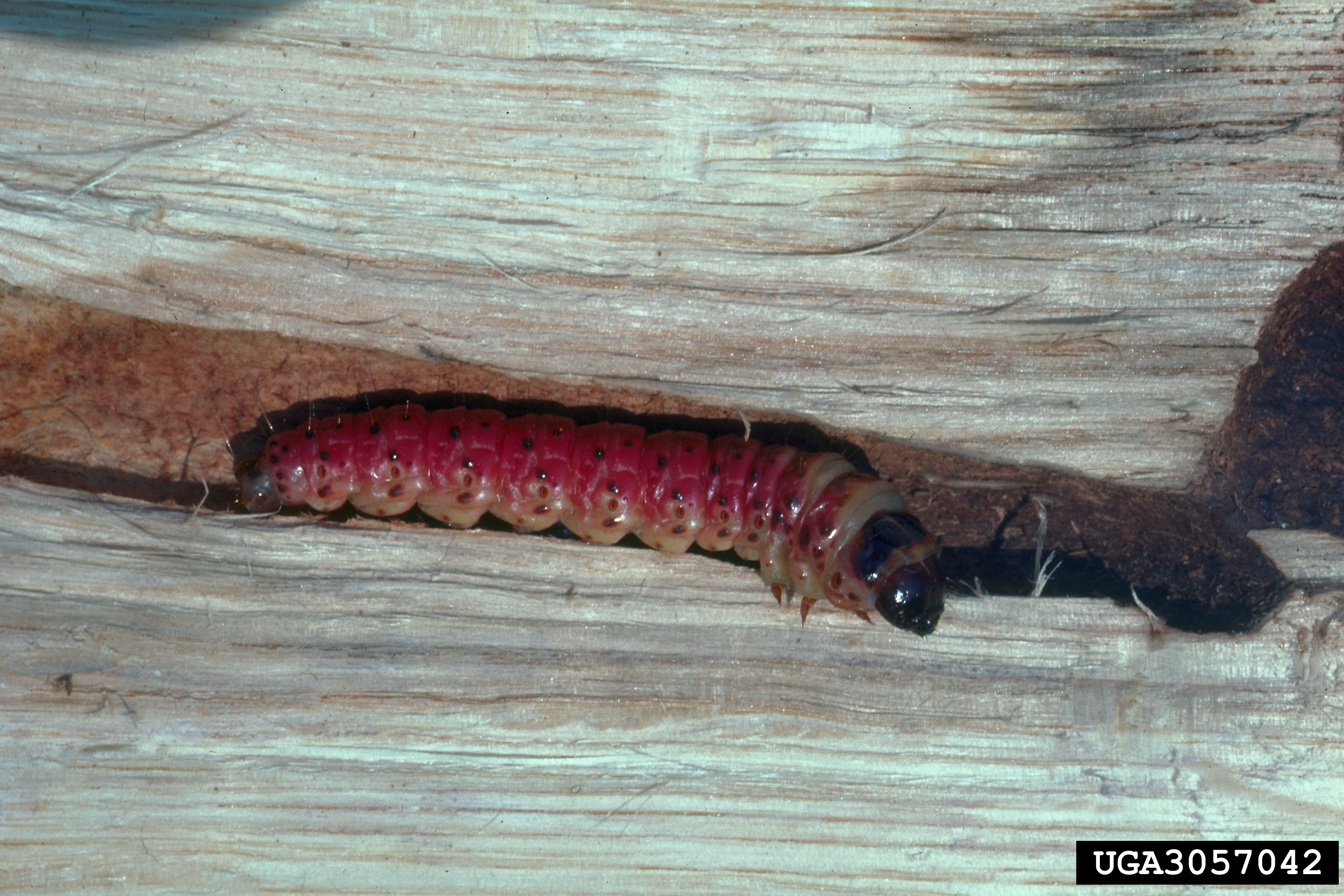

Carpenter Worm (Prionoxystus robiniae), Darkling ground beetle (Blapstinus fuliginosus), Dried fruit beetle (Carpophilus hemipterus), Freeman sap beetle (Carpophilus freemani), Confused sap beetle (Carpophilus mutilatus), Fig beetle (Cotinis texana syn. C. mutabilis), Fig mite (Aceria fici), Fig scale (Lepiosaphes conchiformis), and Navel orangeworm are among the most important pests of fig here.

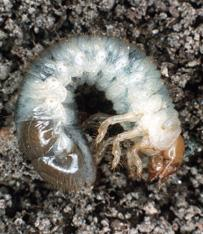

Japanese beetle (Popillia japonica) has been repeatedly found here and repeatedly eradicated. Monitoring and eradication continue especially because of the wide host range of the grubs but also due to the grubs' and adults' destructiveness.

The Plum Bud Gall Mite (Acalitus phloeocoptes (Nalepa)) was first confirmed here in Santa Clara County in February 2019, but may have been found in northern Marin in early 2014. Certainly since 2019 it has become widespread in the Bay Area, as of 2021 reaching Contra Costa, Alameda, San Mateo, Santa Cruz, Sonoma, and north into Western Oregon. So far PBGM is known to be a problem on plum and pluot and not on other stonefruits, especially not almond.

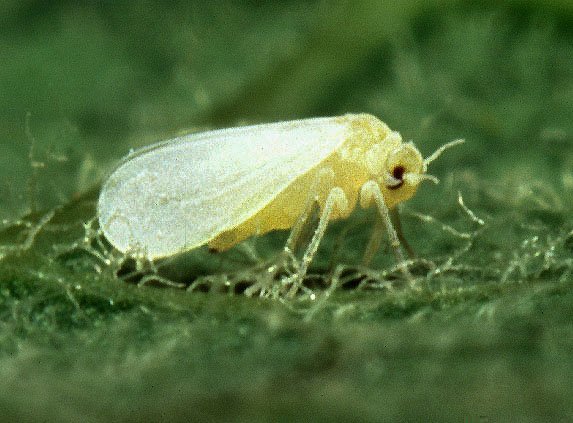

The Silverleaf Whitefly (SLW, Bemisia tabaci strain B) was first noticed here in the fall of 1991. First appearing in the valleys of the state's deserts, it has caused about $500 million in agricultural losses here through 2019. Further economic effects include $774 million in lost sales, $112.5 million in lost personal income, and the loss of 12,540 jobs. SLW is intractable in the southern deserts, especially in Imperial, Palo Verde, Coachella, and the southern part of San Joaquin vallies. In the SJV this is worst on § Cotton. Himler et al., 2011 find the Rickettsia sp. nr. bellii symbiont rapidly invaded the population of California, Arizona and New Mexico.

Aleyrodes spiraeoides is a native whitefly. Hosts include strawberry.

Trialeurodes vaporariorum has recently invaded the Central Coast and Southern areas. Hosts include strawberry.

Trialeurodes packardi is a pest of strawberry whiteflies but less commonly than A. spiraeoides.

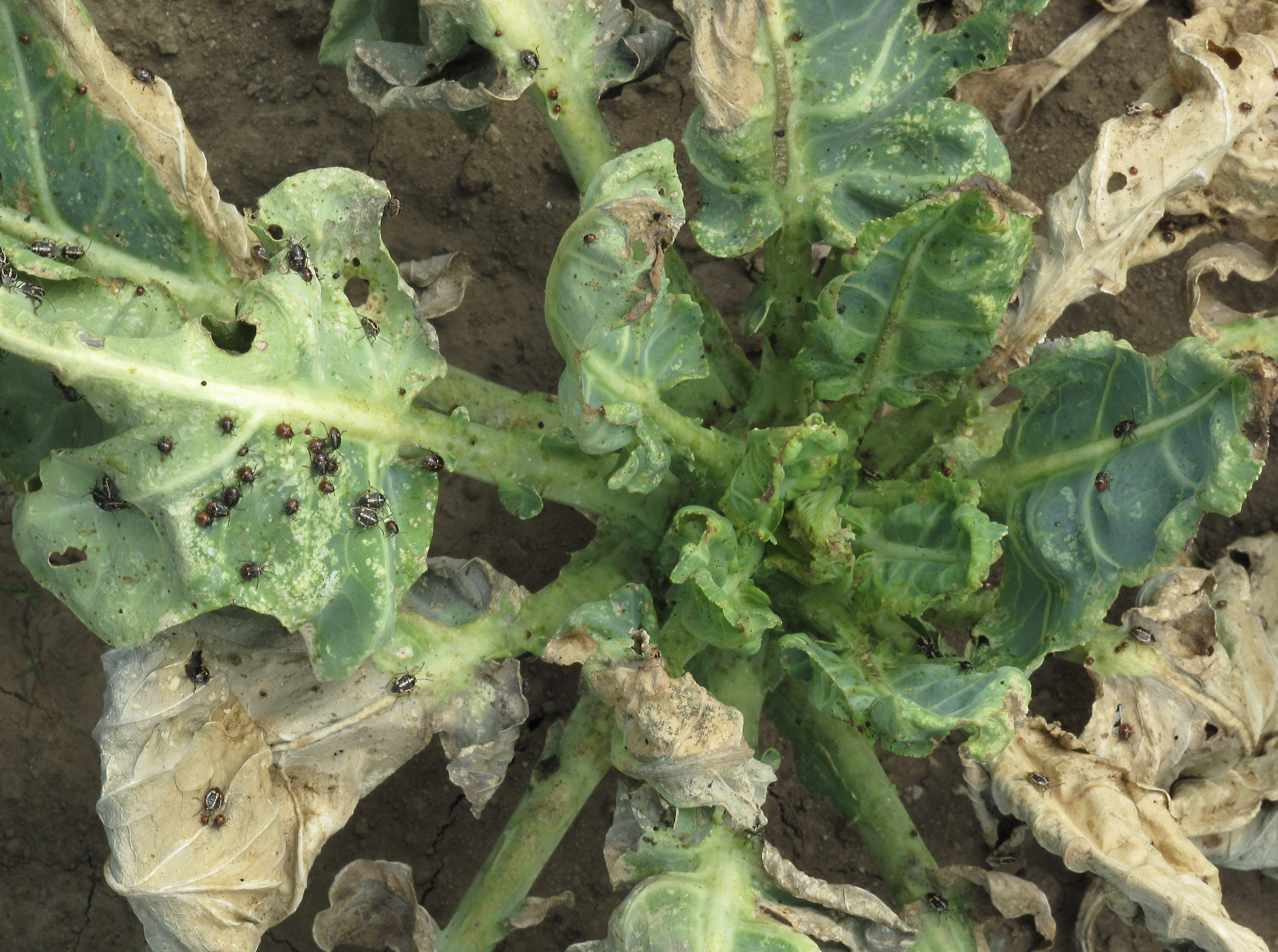

A Painted Bug, Bagrada hilaris was first detected here in 2008 in San Diego, Orange, Los Angeles, 2009 in Ventura, Riverside, and Imperial counties; 2010 in Kern, San Bernardino; no new discoveries here in 2011; 2012 in Santa Barbara & San Luis Obispo; 2013 in Monterey, Santa Cruz, San Benito, Fresno, Tulare, San Francisco; 2014 in Inyo, Kings, Merced, Stanislaus, Santa Clara, Alameda, San Mateo, and Yolo. From here it has become an invasive pest of Brassicas throughout the southwest US, neighboring Coahuila, and the Big Island of Hawaii. The most valuable crop threatened is § Broccoli. Much of the research on this pest in this part of the world has been performed by the Palumbo group at the University of Arizona.

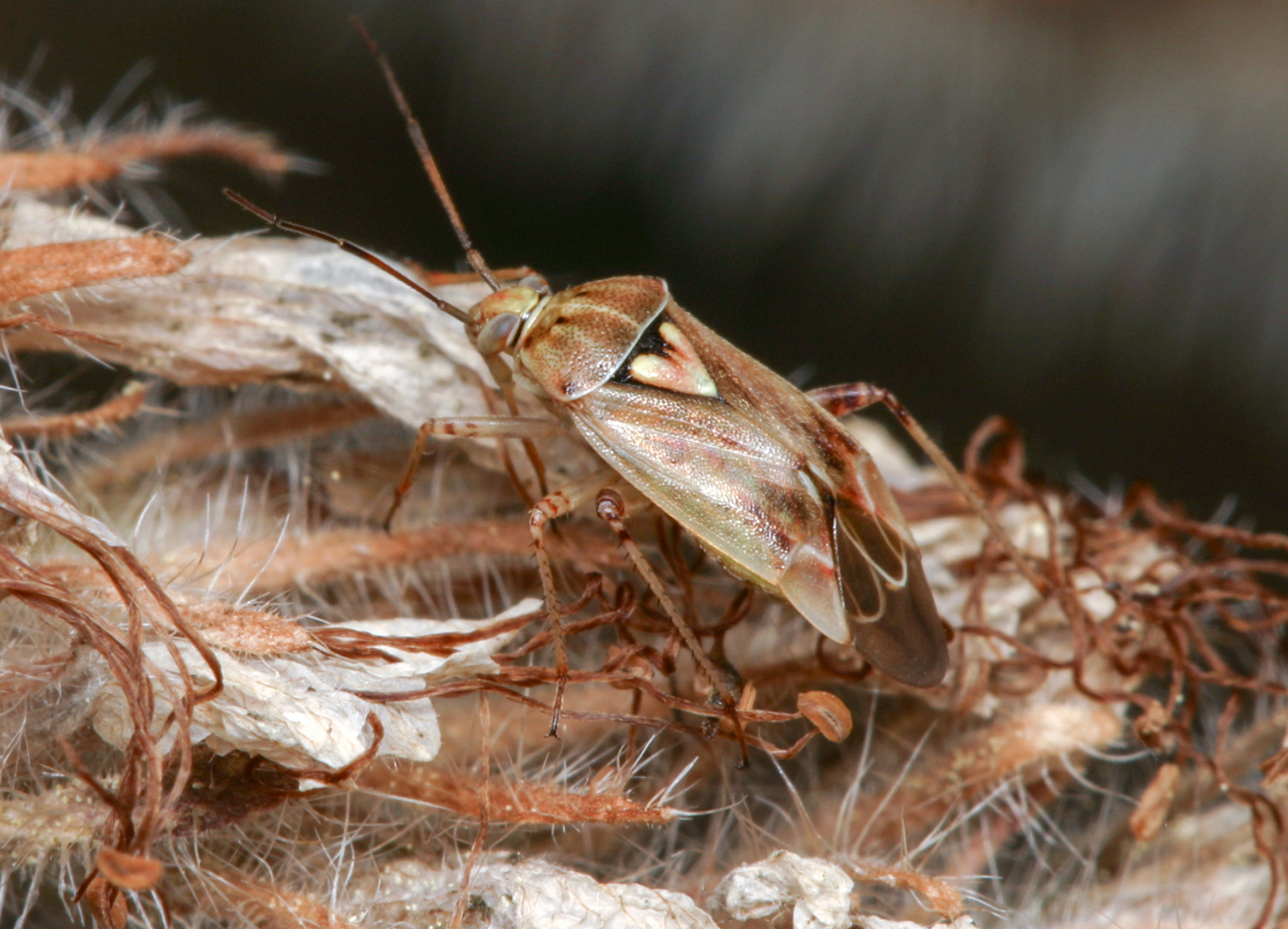

Lygus bugs are common pests here including the Western Tarnished Plant Bug (WTPB, Lygus hesperus). A vacuum collector is often used for WTPB in strawberry, called the BugVac.

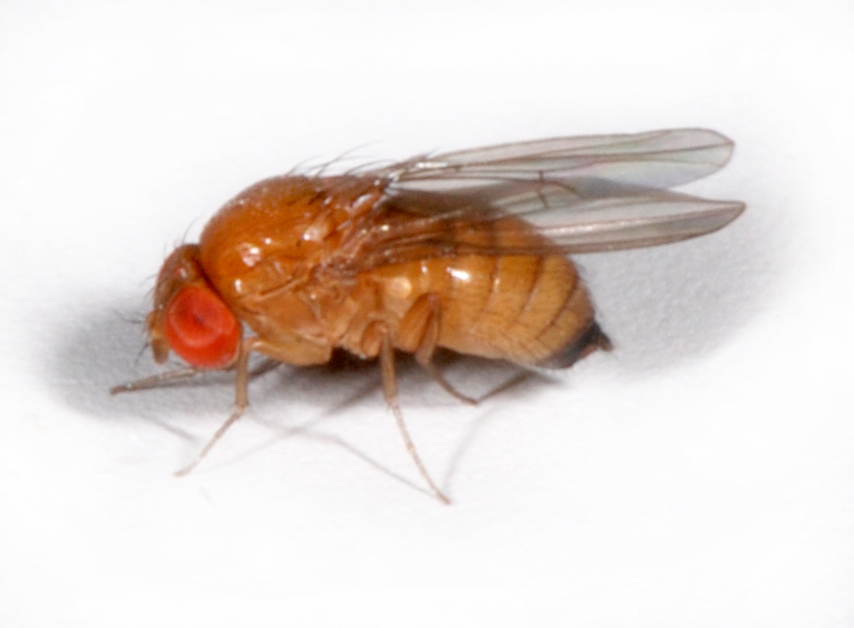

The Spotted Wing Drosophila (Drosophila suzukii) is a major insect pest of soft body fruits here, especially grape, strawberry, tomato, cherry, raspberry and other caneberries, peach and nectarine, fig, and blueberry. Ganaspis brasiliensis is a parasitoid which has been successful as a biocontrol here.

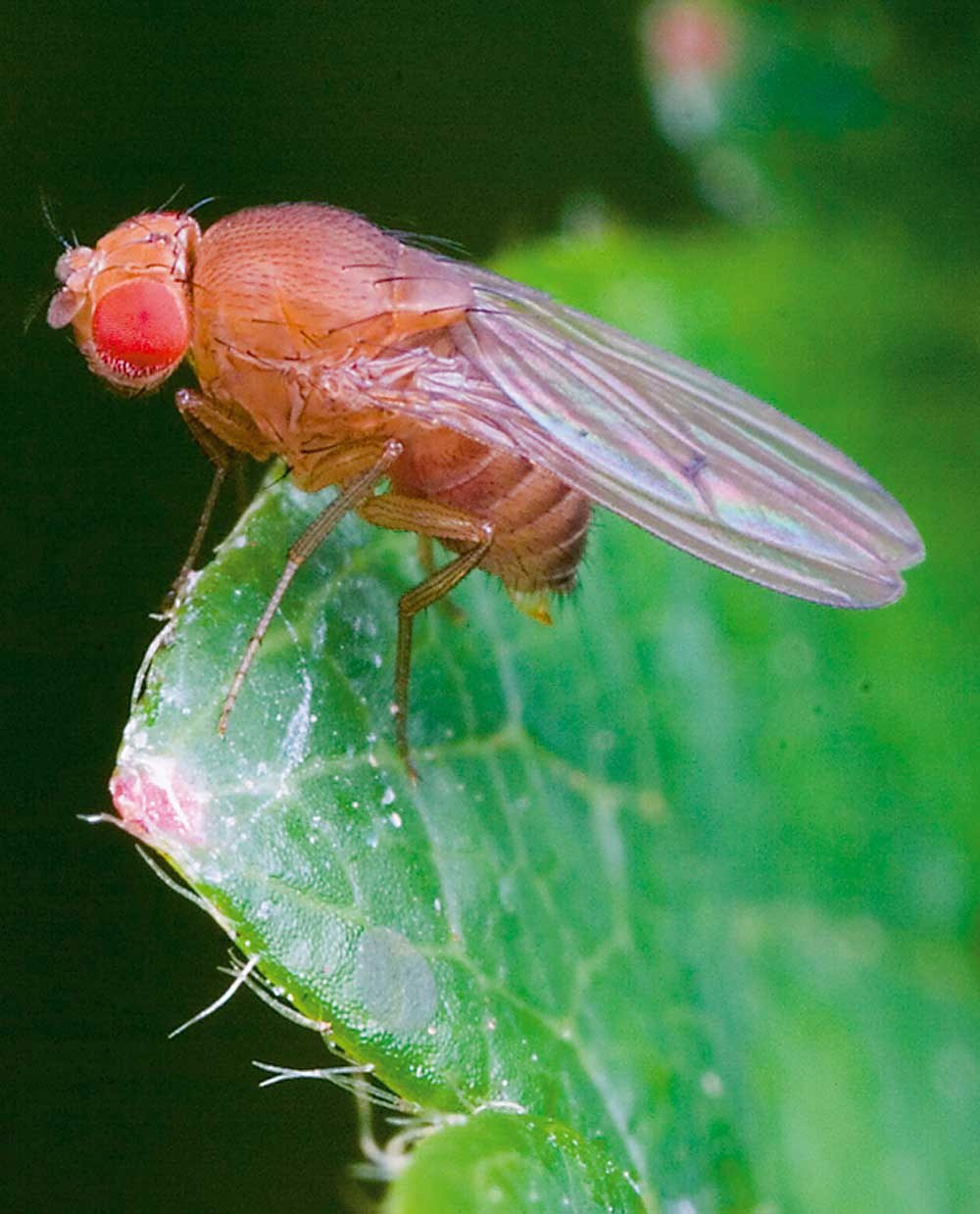

Other Drosophila species include D. melanogaster and D. simulans which vector sour rot and bunch rot pathogens between grape bunches. Hosts include grape and strawberry.

Turelli et al., 1991 uses a genetically modified Wolbachia to suppress D. simulans to suppress its vectored diseases here. (This has become a widely known example of Wolbachia use, and has informed European decision making on vector control.)

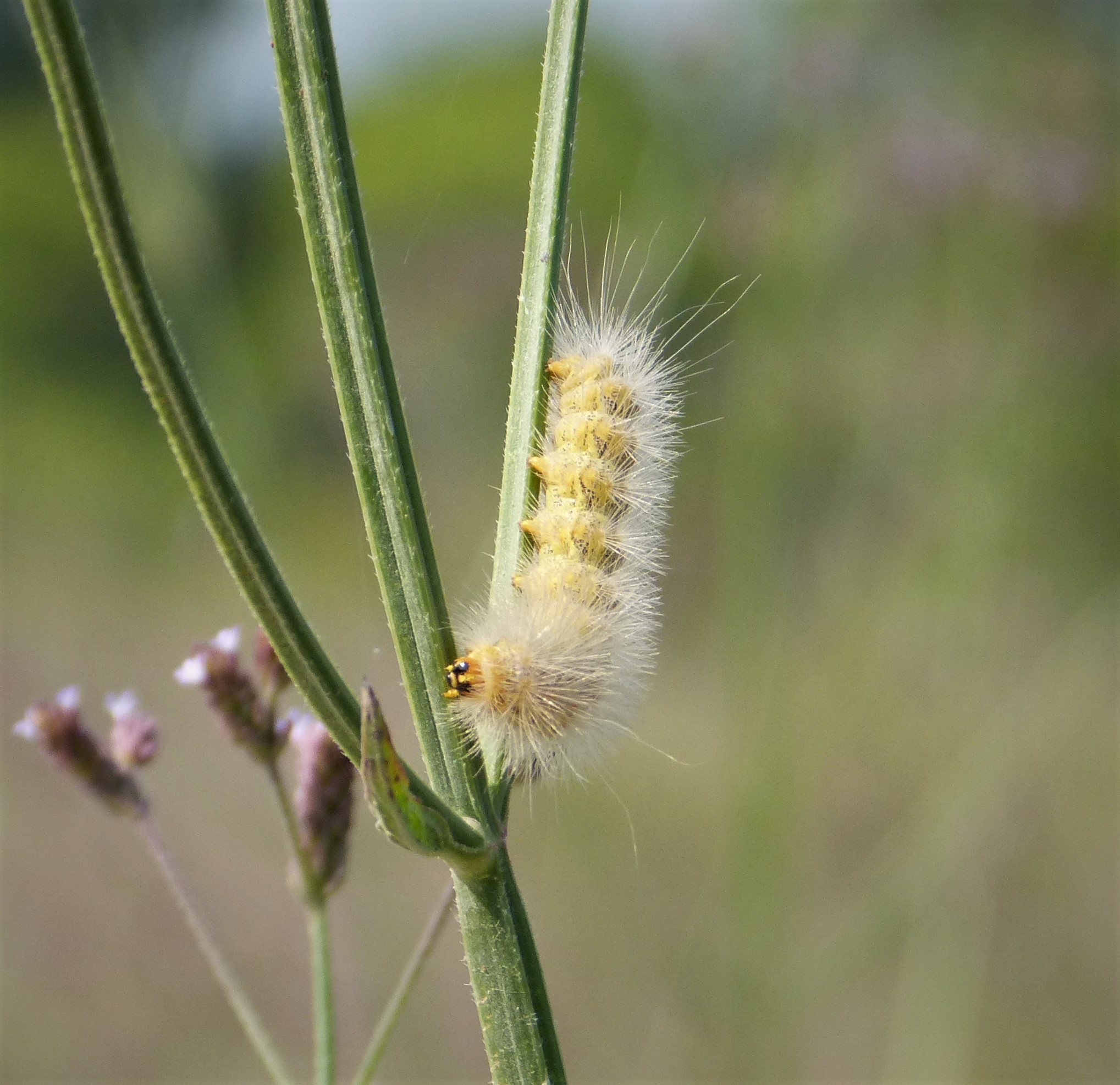

The Salt Marsh Caterpillar (Estigmene acrea) is very common here, but usually causes no damage because they are a native pest with many natural enemies acting as biocontrols. SMC can be significant in strawberry.

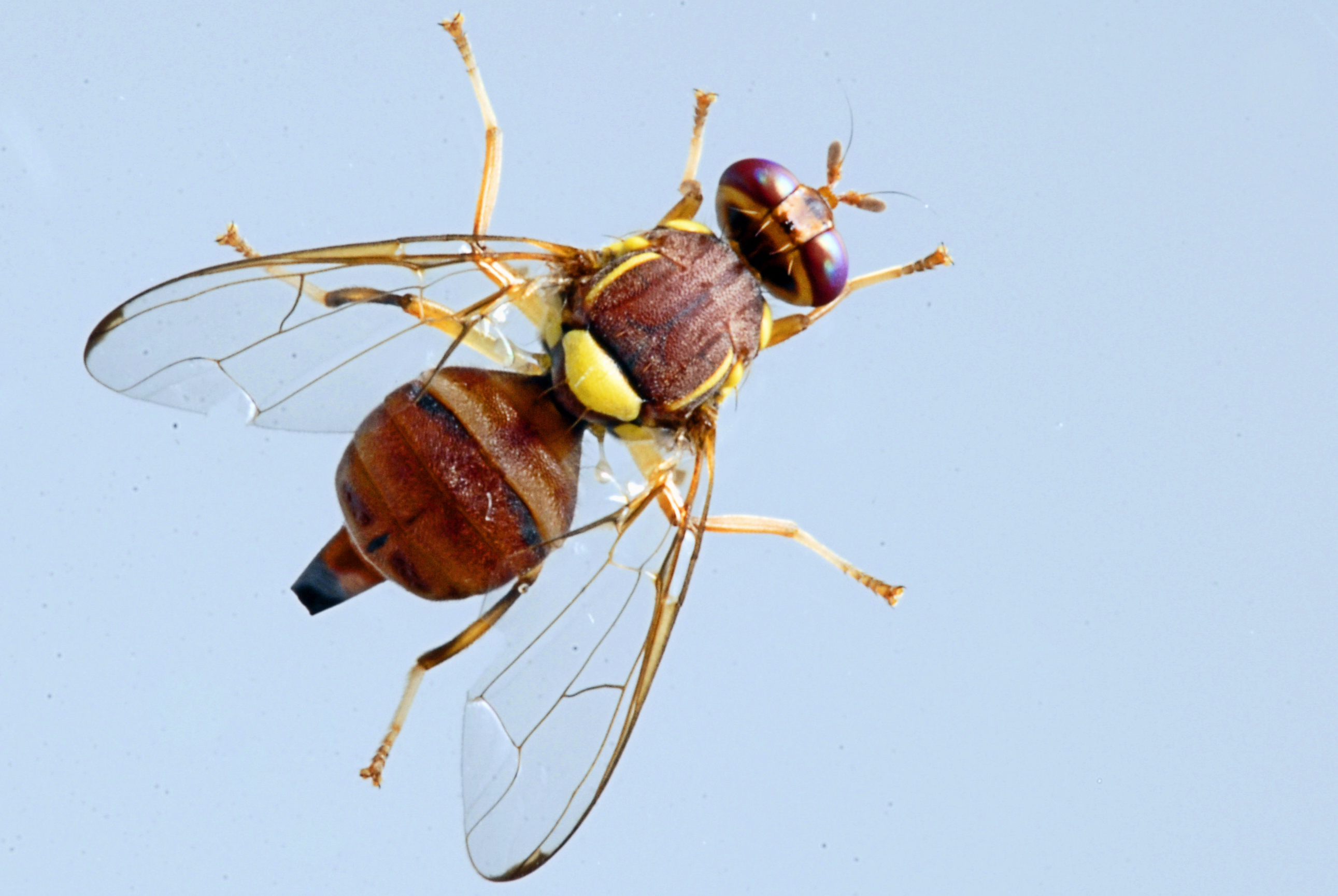

The Peach Fruit Fly (Bactrocera zonata Saunders) has been repeatedly introduced and quickly eradicated here, in 1984 and in 2006. Then on September 29 and/or 30, 2020, three PFF were found in Chowchilla, Madera County. This presents a tremendous hazard not only to the area but to the state, and indeed the entire country. Because the pest may spread from here to other countries, trading partners including the European Union and New Zealand are also concerned. They are considering restricting importation of fruits and vegetables from the state. As a result, the Secretary of CDFA, Karen Ross has declared a biosecurity emergency and eradication efforts using methyl eugenol lures are underway. Especially an immediate concern are California's $2.10b citrus-, $875m stonefruit-, and $1.19b tomato industries.

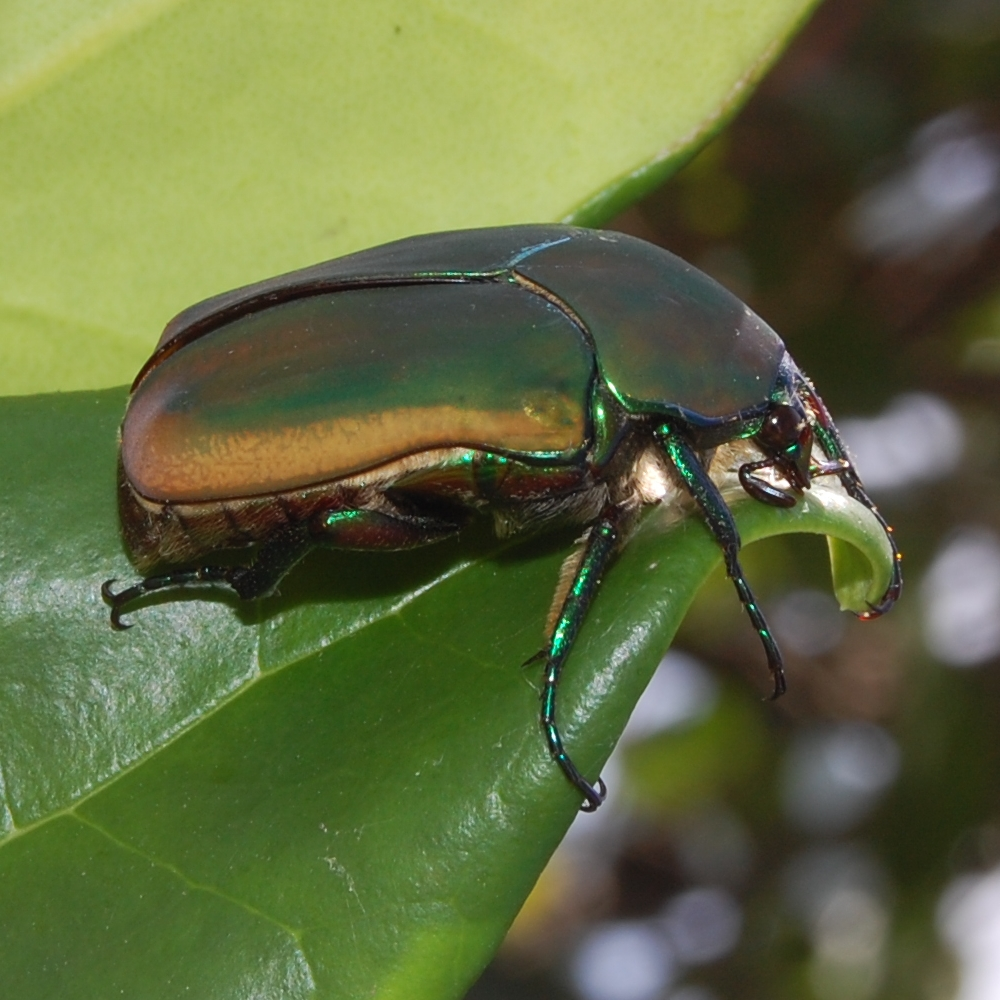

The Green Fruit Beetle (Figeater Beetle, Cotinis mutabilis) is occasionally a pest of ripened fruit, including apricot, caneberry, fig, grape, peach, and plum. The larvae/grubs are harmless however.

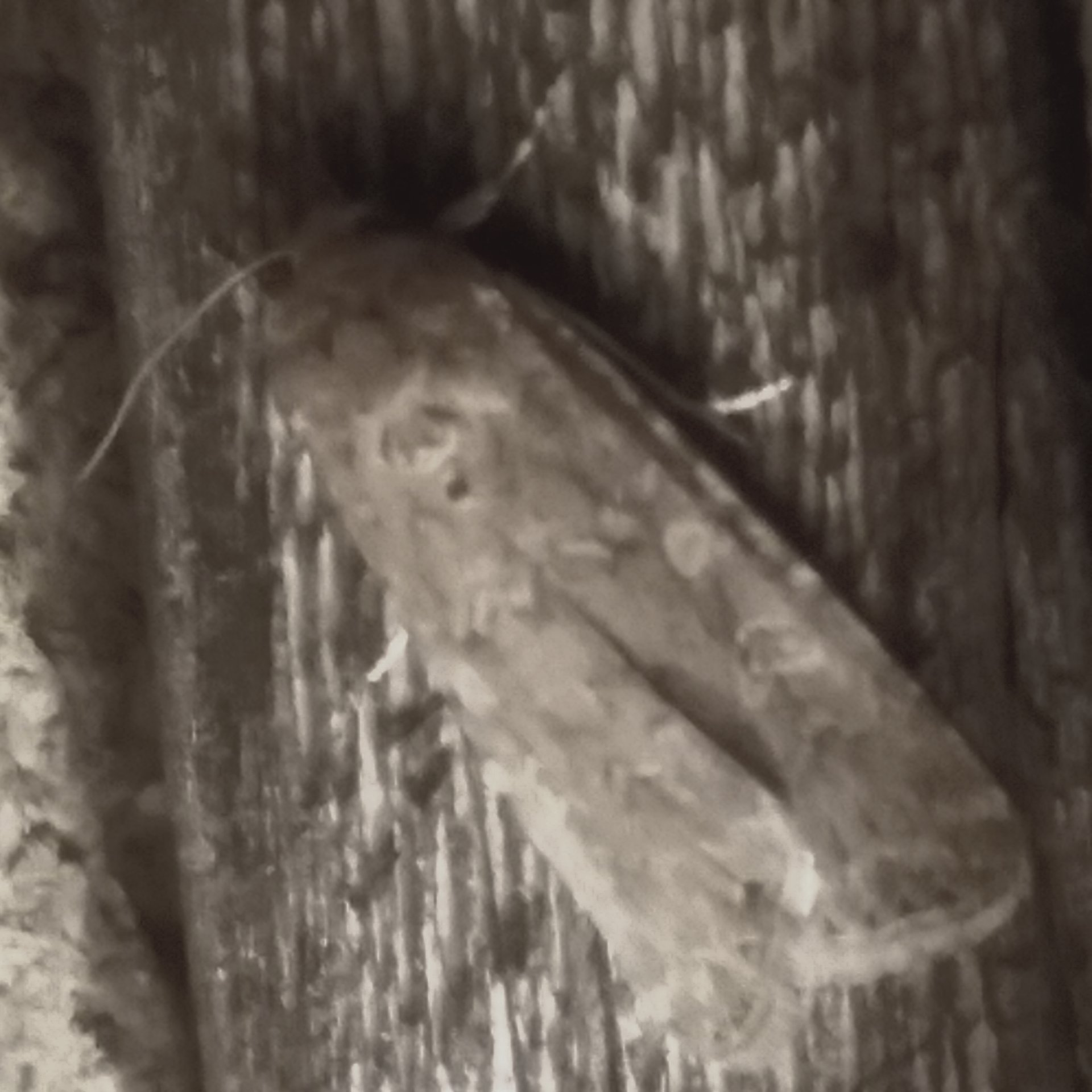

For Beet Armyworms (BAW, Spodoptera exigua) in strawberry and lettuce S. exigua populations here have long standing carbamate resistance.

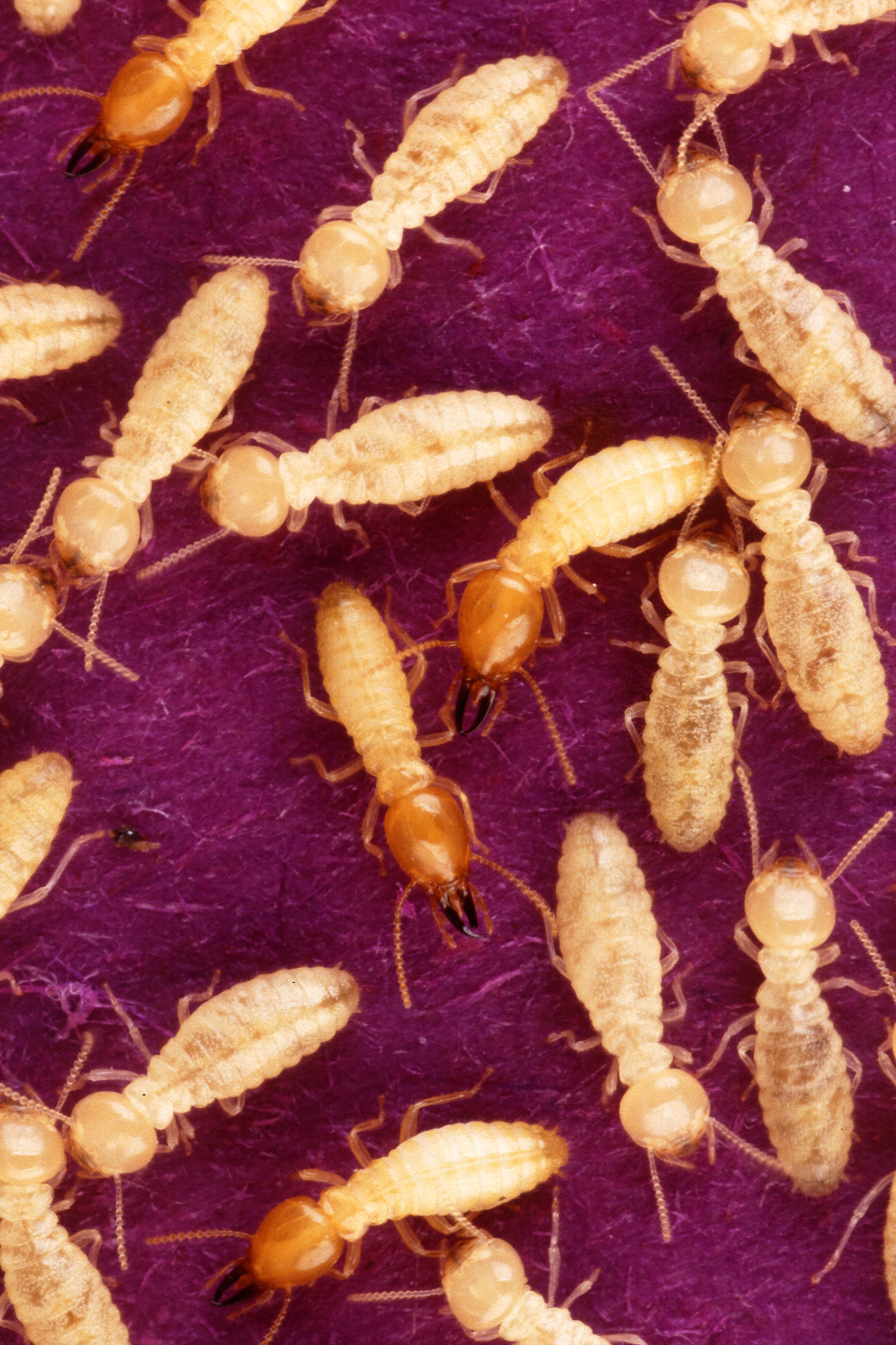

First identified here in 1992 in La Mesa, San Diego County by Haagsma et al., the Formosan Termite (Coptotermes formosanus) has been here since at least 10 years prior. As with every other infestation anywhere in the world, it has never been eradicated, and is still present at the original La Mesa site. In the time since there have been new infestations – mostly suspected to be independent introductions – in Canyon Lake, Riverside County in 2020, Rancho Santa Fe, San Diego County in 2021, Highland Park, Los Angeles County in 2021. The Formosan Termite is a pest of sugarcane, and citrus, but it is most often a structural pest.

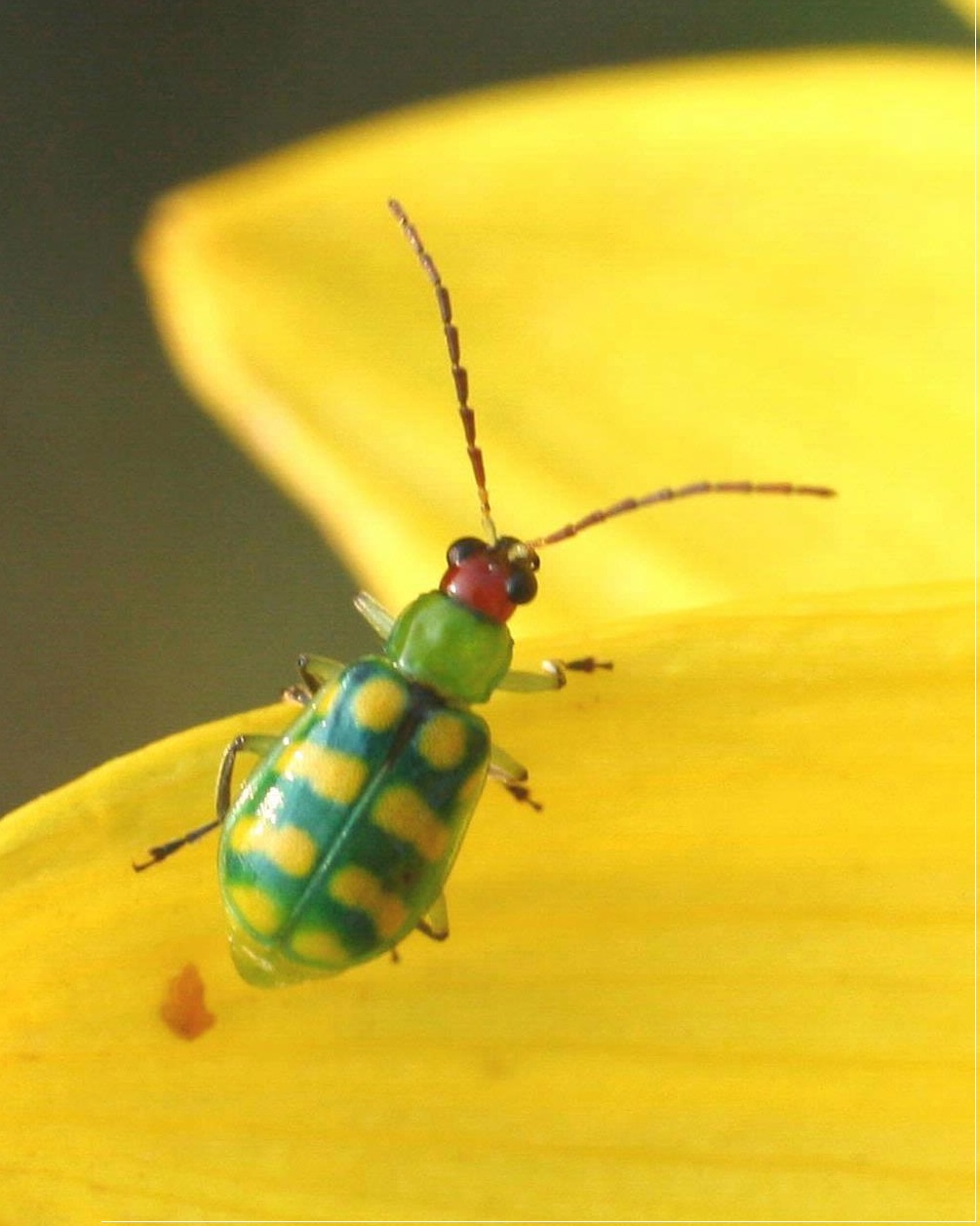

Cucumber Beetles (Diabrotica balteata, Acalymma vittatum, D. undecimpunctata) are common pests here. UC IPM provides recommended practices for apricot,

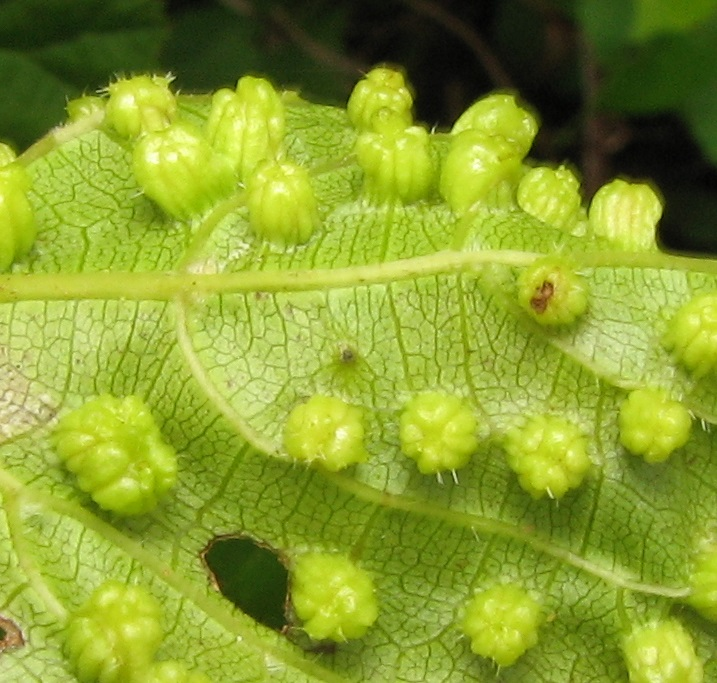
Galls

Phylloxera of Grape (Daktulosphaira vitifoliae) is a perennial aphid problem here. The industry suffered a wipeout in the 1980s due to overreliance on one, non-resistant rootstock. Islam et al., 2013 explains some of the genetic diversity of the population here by sexual reproduction, but their sampling leaves open other possibilities for the remainder. They also find two major subpopulations differentiated by rootstock association: AxR1 associated and those associated with all others.

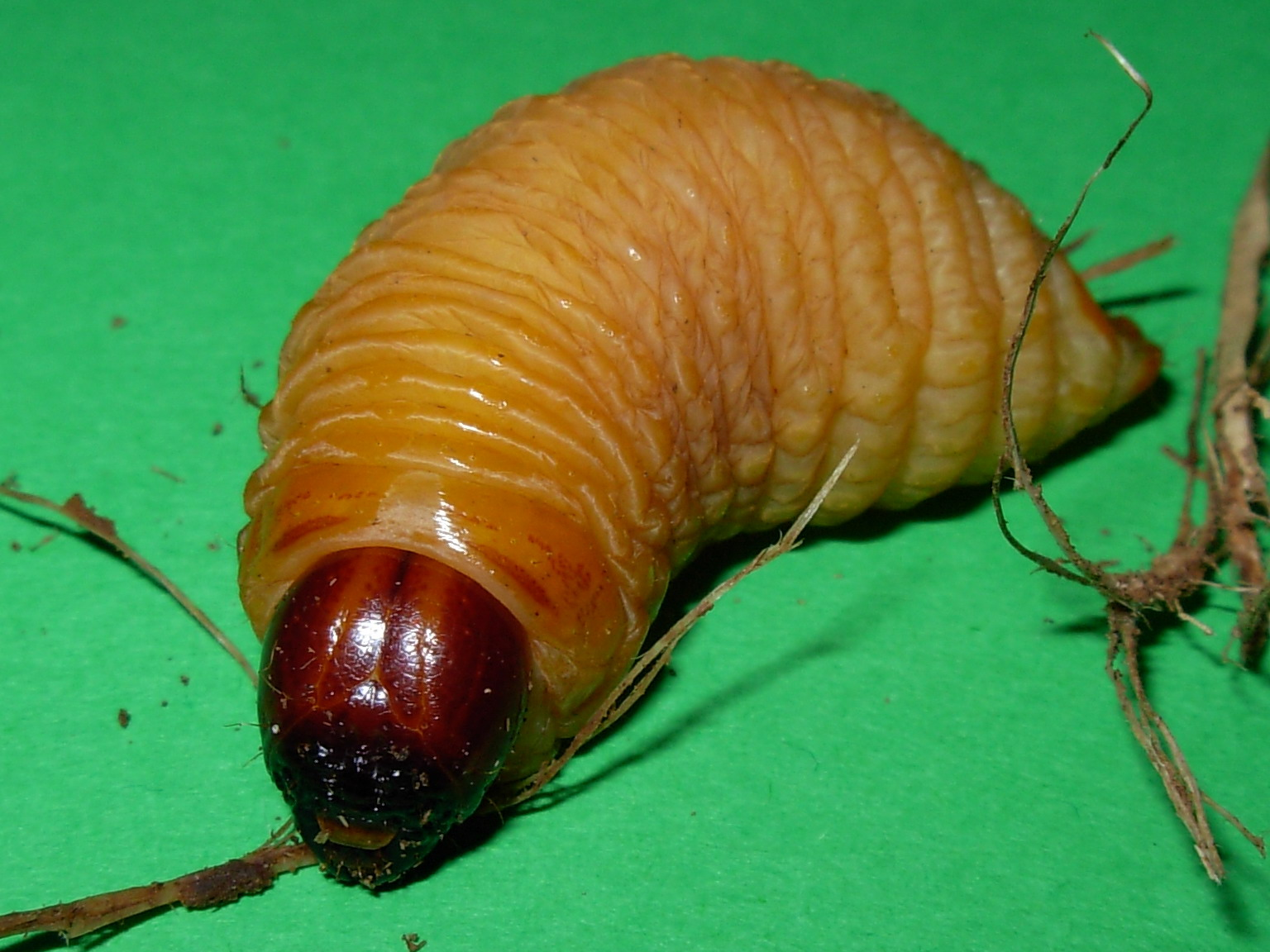

The detection of the Red Palm Weevil (Rhynchophorus ferrugineus) in 2010 was very concerning to this valuable industry. It most likely arrived with in live palms which are commonly sold internationally. The adults flew up to 900 metres (2,953 ft; 984 yd) in a day, and over 3 to 5 days that allowed dispersal up to 7 kilometres (4.3 mi). A tremendous effort was made to trap and eradicate, UCR's Center for Invasive Species Research recommended mostly insecticides, and quick destruction of any palms found to be infested. Pheromone attractant traps were very effective. The California Fan Palm (Washingtonia filifera) and the European Fan Palm (Chamaerops humilis) seemed to be resistant. The last sighting was on January 18, 2012. Three years later on January 20, 2015, USDA's APHIS declared the eradication successful. Its relative the South American palm weevil (R. palmarum) has killed increasing numbers of Canary Island date palms (Phoenix canariensis) and is expected to become a significant pest of dates in the future.

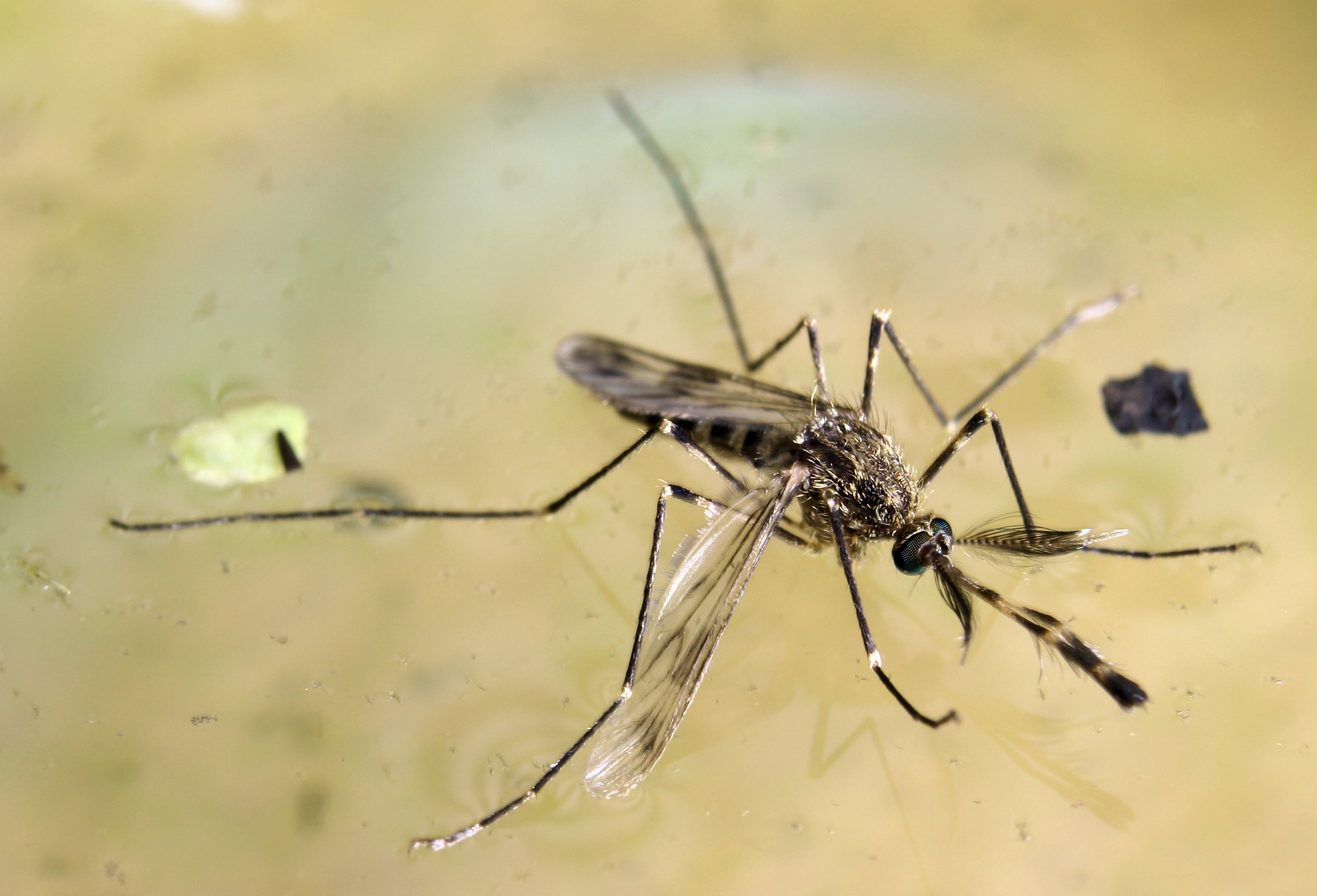

Several Culex mosquitoes are common here including C. quinquefasciatus, C. stigmatosoma, and C. tarsalis. Insecticides are often used in their control and as a result some species have undergone resistance evolution. Mouches et al., 1986 finds one population achieved this via gene amplification of an esterase.

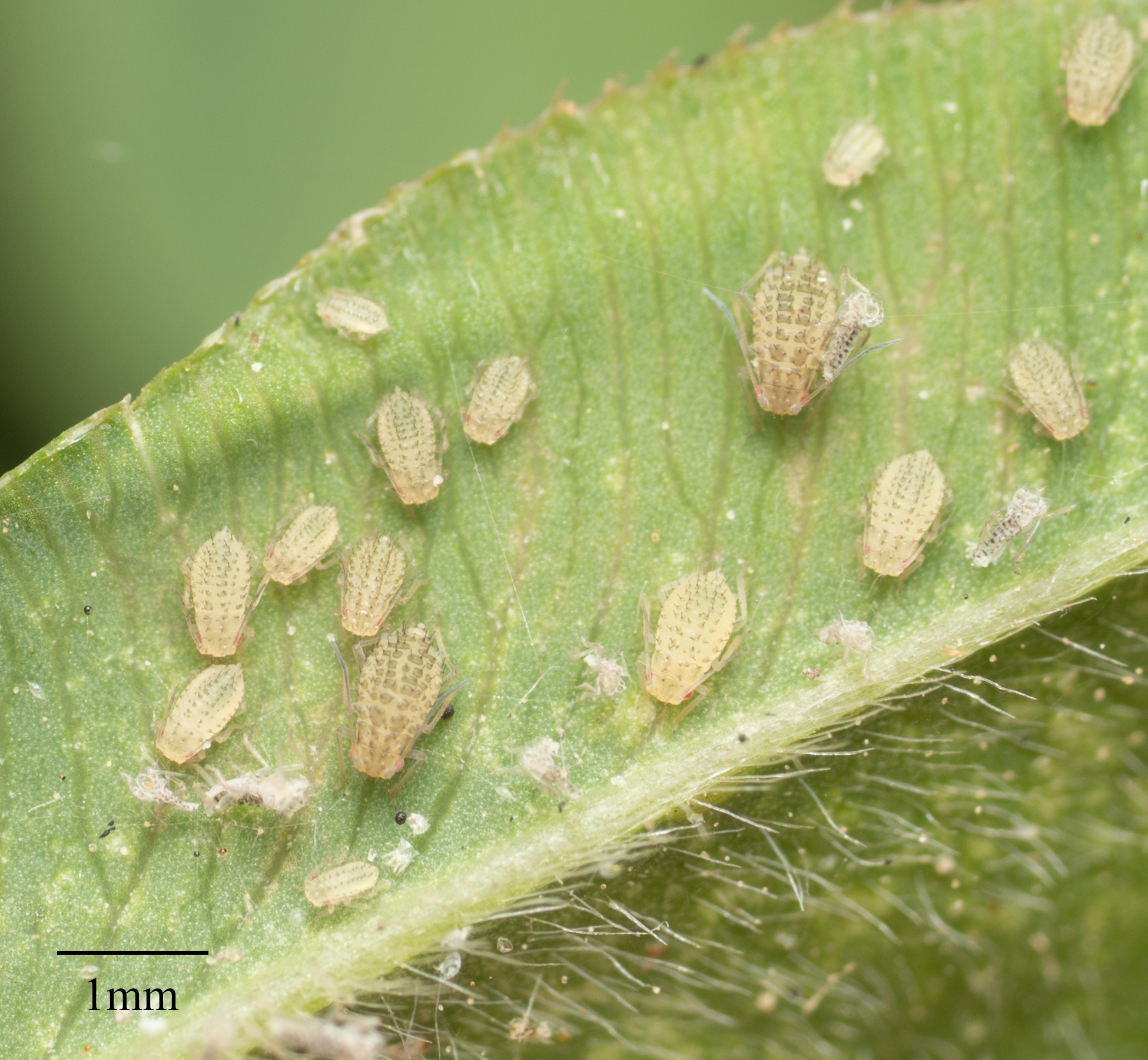

The southern part of the state suffers from the Walnut Aphid (Spotted Alfalfa Aphid, Therioaphis trifolii). Stern & Reynolds 1958 finds that from the beginning of the 1950s to the end of the decade severe parathion resistance had rapidly developed there.

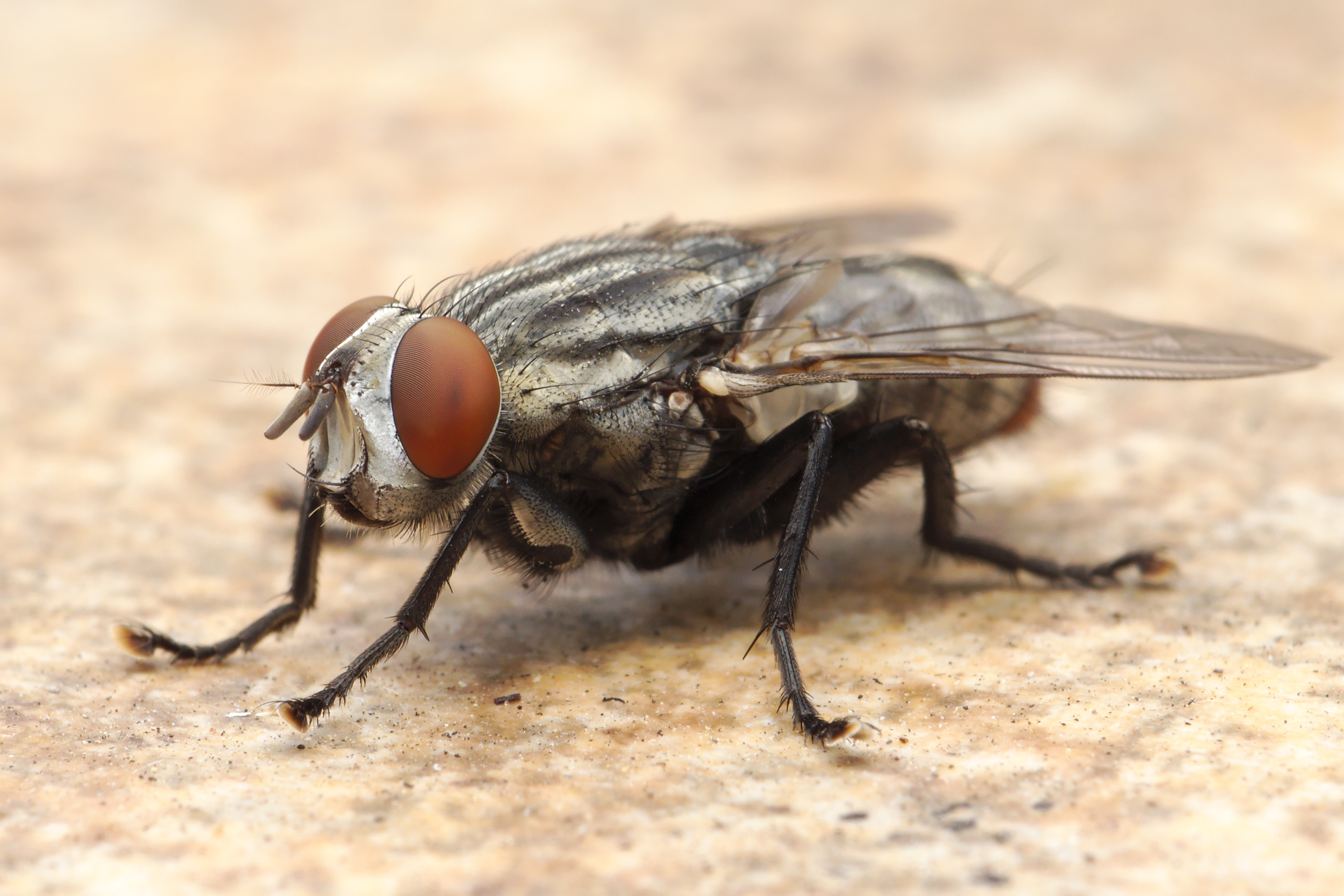

The common House Fly (Musca domestica) is economically significant in poultry production worldwide, including in California. From 1964 to 1969 Georghiou & Hawley 1972 finds rapid evolution of organophosphate resistance in a poultry facility in Moorpark. The most common permethrin kdr allele here is kdr-his, although kdr and super-kdr are also present. (This profile is also found in New Mexican, Floridian, North Carolinian, New York, and Montanan populations.)

The Mexfly (Mexican fruit fly, Anastrepha ludens) has repeatedly invaded the southern part of the state. Sterile insect technique (SIT) has been used to great success to eradicate them every time, both here and in Texas.

The Medfly (Mediterranean fruit fly, Ceratitis capitata) has also been controlled with SIT both here and in Florida, although before 1980 both states used malathion baits. Eradication by SIT was accomplished with the help of the Nuclear Techniques in Food and Agriculture program, a joint effort of the United Nations Food and Agriculture Organization and the International Atomic Energy Agency (FAO-IAEA). Studies of the Medfly invasion here show that there have been many almost-invasions at the state's airports and other ports, most of which have failed to establish including a small infestation in 1975 in Los Angeles which was eradicated using SIT. This has informed quarantine and invasion biology efforts and studies on the Medfly around the world.

Tetranychus is a genus of spider mites. Three species are common on cotton here including the Pacific Spider Mite (Tetranychus pacificus) and the Two-Spotted Spider Mite (T. urticae). and they are hard to distinguish because they are sympatric. Distinguishing them is nonetheless necessary, because they differ widely in insecticide resistance, with the PSM the worst. The PSM and 2SSM are also significant in peach here. Two-Spotted Spider Mite is also a major pest of strawberry,

Cotton Aphids (Aphis gossypii, Melon Aphid) afflict cotton and melon crops here. Insecticides are commonly used, and this has produced resistance and may also contaminate their honeydew. Insecticide contaminated honeydew may harm beneficial insects.

The Avocado Thrips (Scirtothrips perseae) and Persea Mite (Oligonychus perseae) are two invasive pests here.

The Tobacco Budworm (Chloridea virescens, Heliothis virescens) is common on cotton in the Imperial Valley. At least by 1985 C. virescens had developed permethrin resistance. Nicholson & Miller 1985 find severe metabolic resistance to permethrin in Imperial Valley populations.

Western Flower Thrips (Frankliniella occidentalis) is a major pest of horticulturals around the world. Here, it is especially known as a pest of peach and strawberry.

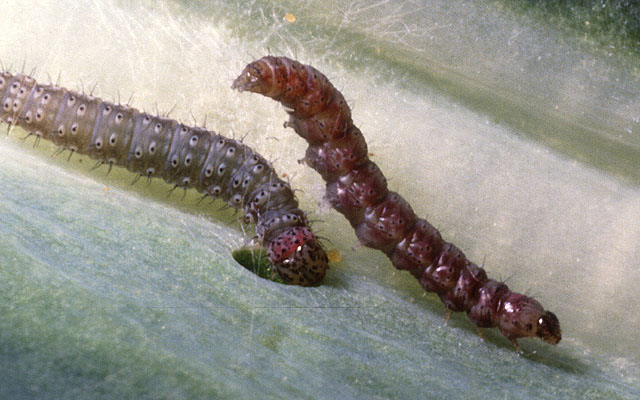

The Diamondback Moth (Plutella xylostella) is a common insect pest here. Btk (Bacillus thuringiensis kurstaki) is a commonly used insectide for Diamondback Moth control in California. Shelton et al., 2000 finds a high degree of natural genetic variation in Btk resistance in the state's DM population.

Several Aedes spp. are present. A. aegypti is found as an exotic pest here. Gloria-Soria et al., 2016 finds a significant amount of shared genetics between the population of the southern part of the state and New Mexico, Arizona, and Mexico.

Procambarus clarkii is an invasive crayfish across the Western US. It was first imported to a frog farm in San Diego County in 1932, and proved so successful as feed and food that descendants were sold around the state. They escaped and now are a widespread nuisance.

Lymantria dispar (spongy moth, gypsy moth) is an established pest here. Epanchin-Niell et al., 2012 find that annual surveillance costs can be easily reduced. Costs are reduced by 50% by targeting surveillance resources based on the difference in surveillance cost by location, and by the difference in establishment risk by location.

California red scale (Aonidiella aurantii) is an invasive pest here. It competitively displaced a prior invader Yellow scale (A. citrina). Debach et al., 1978 finds that A. citrina is now extinct in this state due to the invasion of A. aurantii.

The Black Vine Weevil (Otiorhynchus sulcatus) is mostly found in the Central Coast AVA but does rarely occur elsewhere. Hosts include grape and strawberry. Creeping red fescue (Festuca rubra) is an alternate host.

Otiorhynchus cribricollis (Cribrate weevil) is common in the San Joaquin Valley. It is sometimes a problem in strawberry in the area.

Helicoverpa zea (syn. Heliothis zea) is common in several parts of the state including all strawberry growing areas. H. zea is especially troublesome in southern coastal California.

Cyclamen Mites occur natively here. Hosts include strawberry.

Scutigerella immaculata is an introduced pest restricted to high moisture soil. Hosts include strawberry.

Some slugs (Gastropoda spp.) are vegetable and fruit pests here. Several are introduced pests from Europe. Hosts include strawberry.

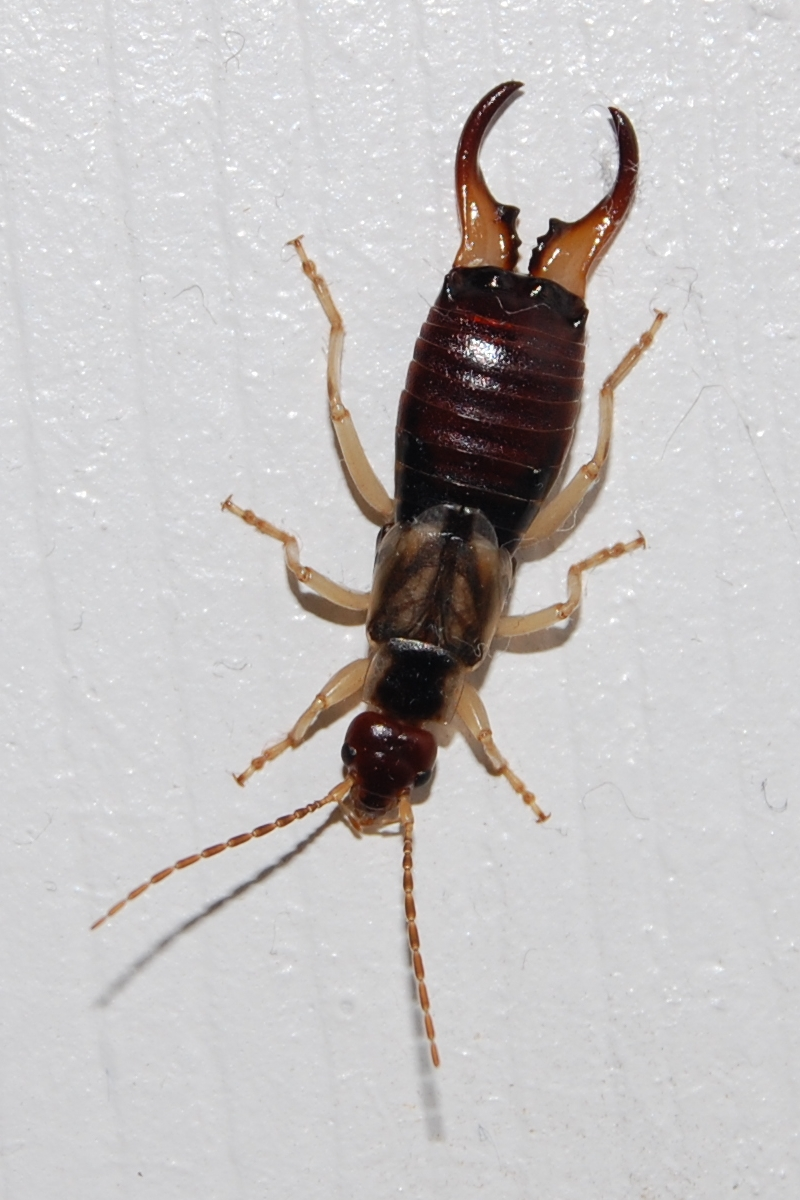

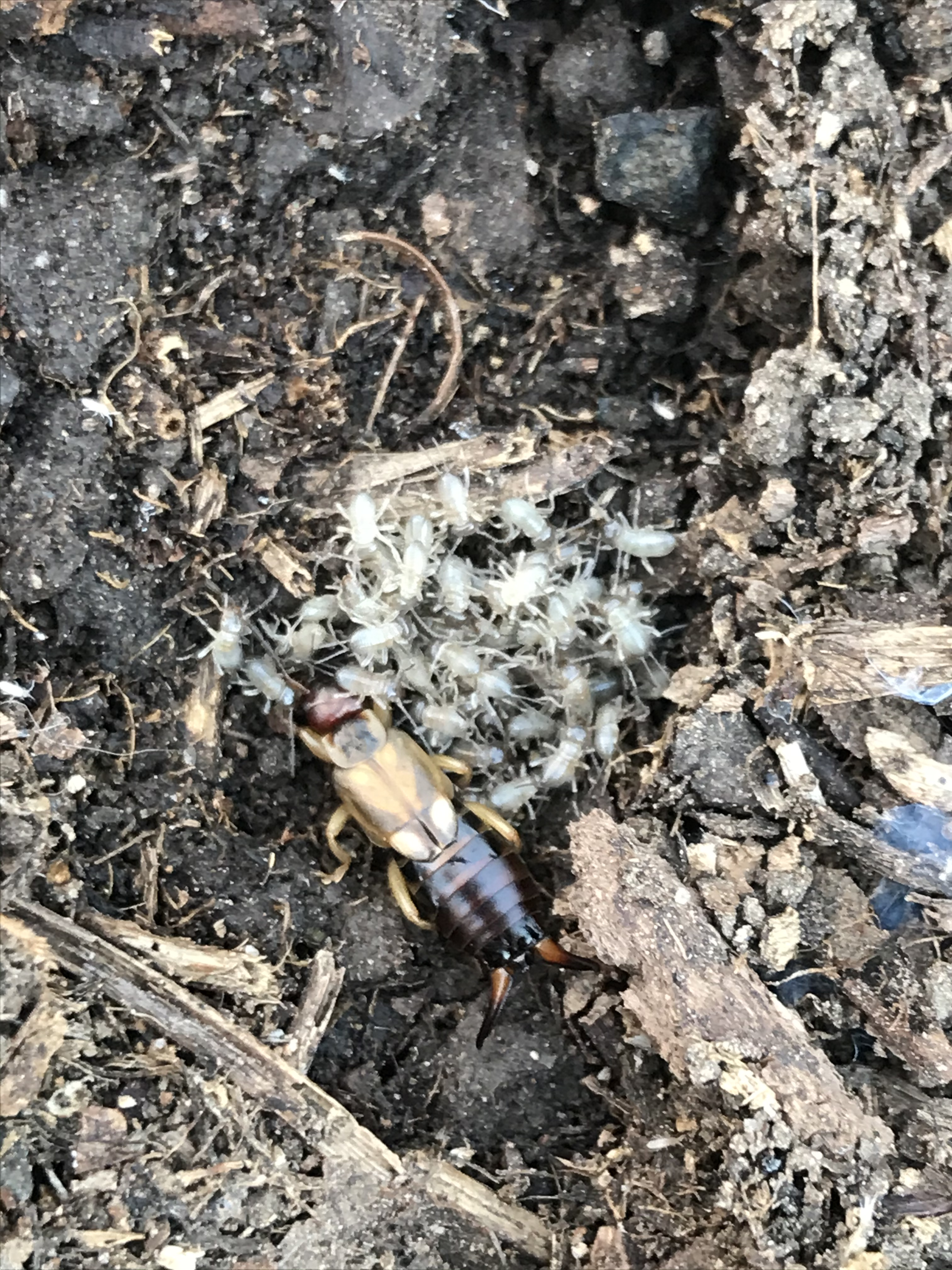

European Earwigs are most destructive from April to July here. Hosts include strawberry.

Eotetranychus lewisi is found in coastal areas including Oxnard and Salinas. Hosts include strawberry.

Agrotis ipsilon is the most common cutworm here. Hosts include strawberry.

Pandemis pyrusana is present and eats the leaves of several crops. Hosts include strawberry.

Clepsis peritana is an ecologically important saprovore. Later in the season it is a pest of strawberry.

Myzus persicae is present. Hosts include strawberry.

Macrosiphum euphorbiae is much larger than other aphids in California. Populations here have two forms, a green and a red. Hosts include strawberry.

Aedes albopictus is a pest of livestock concern. Modified Wolbachia have been released to control this species here.

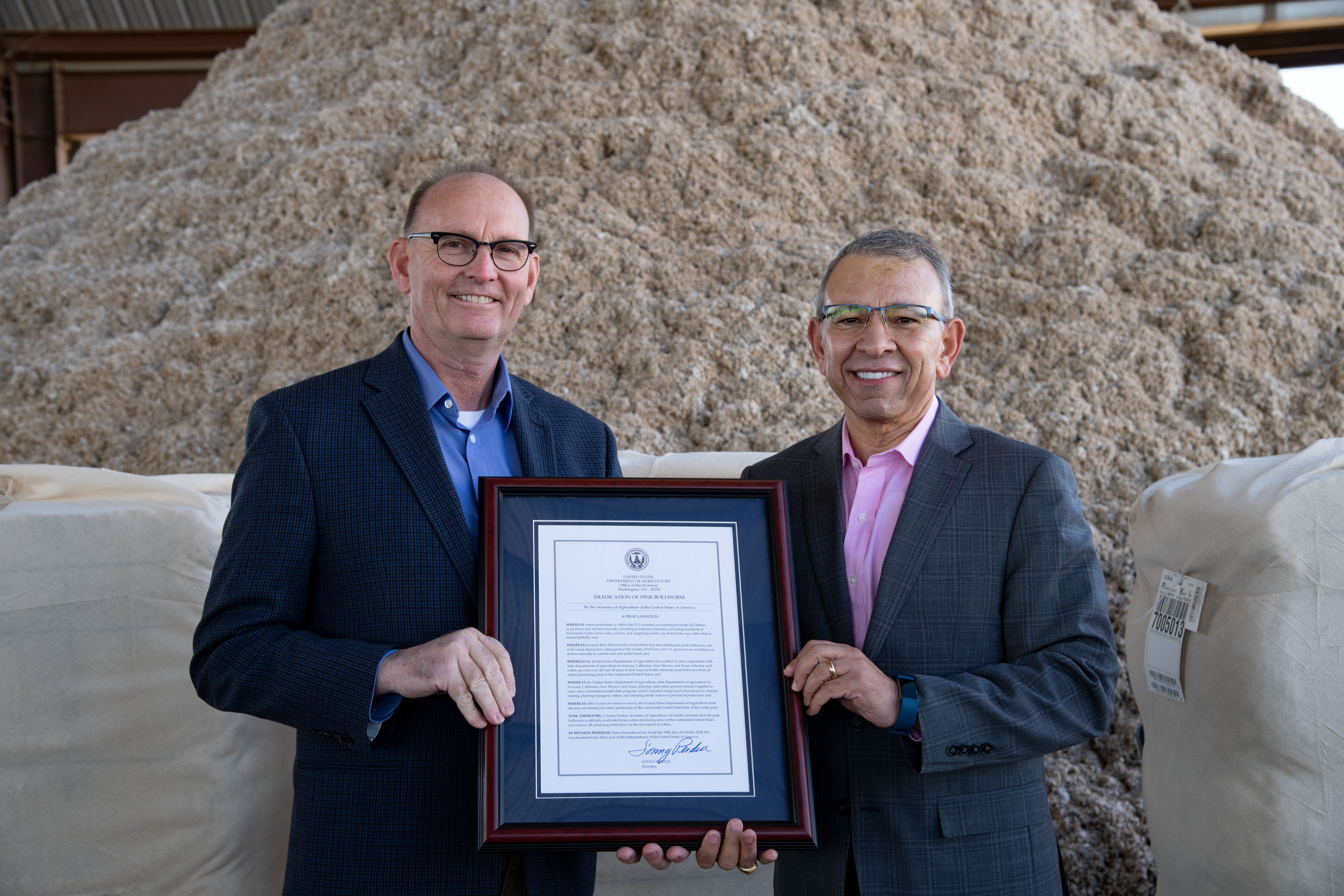
El-Lissy, eradication ceremony

The Pink Bollworm (Pectinophora gossypiella) was devastating to cotton growers here and throughout the southwest. Chu et al., 1996 reports a management program in the Imperial Valley in which government imposed practices successfully reduced populations.

== Weeds ==
Rejmanek & Pitcairn 2002 overview 53 weed eradication campaigns in the state, and find that any infestation smaller than 2.5 acres (1.0 ha) was usually successfully eradicated, while anything which had already reached 2,500 acres (1,000 ha) was essentially impossible to do.

Yellow Sweetclover (Melilotus officinalis L. Lam.), Chickweed (Stellaria spp.), Annual Bluegrass (Poa annua Linnaeus), Shepherd's Purse (Capsella bursa-pastoris Linnaeus Medikus), Crabgrass (various Digitaria spp.), Spotted Spurge (Euphorbia maculata Linnaeus Small), and Yellow Nutsedge (Cyperus esculentus) are common weeds here, including in strawberry and parsley. (See § Strawberries, and § Parsley.)

Marestail (Horseweed, Conyza canadensis, Erigeron canadensis) is a common native weed here. Glyphosate-resistant marestail first appeared in the state in the Central Valley in 2005 and this resistance spread unusually rapidly through the southern Valley thereafter. Okada et al., 2013 finds several independent evolutionary events, and that these unrelated resistance alleles may have been passed along so quickly because C. canadensis can reproduce by selfing. Hairy Fleabane (Conyza bonariensis, Erigeron bonariensis) is one of the major weeds in peach here. The Okada group also studies glyphosate-resistant Hairy Fleabane.

In the Central Valley the most common weeds are cool-season grass weeds (Poaceae), thistles (Asteraceae), mustards (Brassicaceae), fiddleneck (Boraginaceae), warm-season grass weeds, warm-season Cyperaceae, amaranths (Amaranthaceae), morning glory (Convolvulaceae), and caltrop (Tribulus terrestris, Zygophyllaceae). Achmon et al., 2018 dramatically lowered seed bank viability, biomass, and density of all these weeds, and improved tomato yield using biosolarization using tomato and grape crop waste.

Cape-ivy (Delairea odorata) is an invasive weed originally from the Drakensberg Mountains in South Africa and Swaziland. It was first observed here in 1892 and has since spread to every coast of the state, and into one coastal county of Oregon. Two organisms have been found in its native range which could be introduced here as controls, see § Digitivalva delaireae and § Cercospora delaireae.

Sea Beet (Beta vulgaris subsp. maritima) and Beta macrocarpa are introduced weeds here. The allozyme analysis of Bartsch & Ellstrand 1999 shows free gene flow between these two and cultivated beet. Wild beet is only significant in small grains in Imperial, where dicamba and 2,4-D are necessary. See also § Small grains.

Palmer Amaranth (Amaranthus palmeri) was first discovered in San Diego County by Sereno Watson in 1876. It has since spread elsewhere, developed the worst multiresistance in the world, and become one of the most notorious crop weeds in the world. In California it is found in all but the northernmost counties.

California wild radish (radish (Raphanus sativus) × Jointed charlock (R. raphanistrum)) has replaced all of its ancestral populations in the state.

Di Tomaso and Healy 2007 find Chenopodium album requires years of continuous management for any significant seedbank reduction.

== Pathogens ==
=== Xylella fastidiosa ===
X. fastidiosa was first discovered here by Newton B. Pierce (1856–1916) in 1892. It has ever since remained a constant pathogen of many crops here, including grape, almond, citrus, and oleander.

==== Pierce's Disease ====
The CDFA's Pierce's Disease Control Program coordinates response and research in the state. Alston et al., 2013 estimates that PD cost the state $92m in 2013 and over Tumber et al., 2014 estimates $104m annually in 2014. Burbank estimates the cost to be $100m annually by 2022.

GWSS remains a common vector of PD and as such is a severe drag on the entire continent's wine grape and table grape pricing and supply. In the Napa- and Sonoma- Valleys and other such costal AVAs PD mostly occurs in hotspots adjacent to small water flows. These areas are defined by small streams and ornamental irrigation. These are favorable habitat for the BGSS. Lin et al., 2005 provides SSRs for differentiating between the state's various strains infecting grape and other crops and Lin et al., 2013 for grape-infecting strains here and in Texas.

The BGSS is known to thrive in higher temperatures and PD epidemics are more severe in hotter years, and there is evidence that global warming is increasing BGSS transmission of PD here. Larger data sets are needed for stronger confirmation.

There are two major divisions here, a lineage from Bakersfield and Santa Barbara and another from Temecula and the north. Within the northern areas there is lower gene flow, probably due to the Mayacamas Mountains.

Zhang et al., 2011 compares a PD strain to EB92-1 and finds that they are surprisingly similar. EB92-1 is a biocontrol strain discovered by Hopkins in 1992 and published as Hopkins 2005. It is originally from elderberry (Sambucus spp.) and is highly persistent on grapevine but is asymptomatic. Zhang finds that the EB92-1 genome is a proper subset of the Temecula1 genome, lacking 11 missing genes, 10 of which are predicted to be pathogenicity factors.

Vanhove et al., 2020 elucidates the current genetic situation of PD strains here, including population structure and their evolution.

==== Xf in stonefruit ====
Xf is also significant in stonefruit here, causing Almond leaf scorch disease and other diseases. Xf isolates CFBP8071 and M23 are common on almond here. Moralejo et al., 2019 shed some light on the European invasion of this pathogen. Their analysis shows these isolates have a 99.4% nucleotide identity with those on grape in the introduced range – and more generally, these isolates, a European cherry infection, and PD isolates from both areas have a high degree of relatedness. Chen et al., 2005 provides PCR primers, Lin et al., 2015 Simple Sequence Repeats (SSRs), and Chen et al., 2010 the first genome sequence for common almond-infecting strains here. Lin et al., 2005 provides SSRs for differentiating strains from almond from various other strains. While almond and plum develop leaf scorch, Ledbetter & Rogers 2009 find that peach does not.

Besides Pierce's Disease, the glassy-winged sharpshooter also vectors Xf among stonefruit and so its arrival threatens the world's almond supply.

==== Xf of citrus ====
Lin et al., 2005 provides Simple Sequence Repeats (SSRs) which distinguish California's Citrus Variegated Chlorosis strains from almond, oleander, and PD strains.

==== Other Xf infections ====
Xf has many other hosts. Chitalpa tashkentensis is a common landscaping plant here and elsewhere in the southwest that is also a host. Randall et al., 2009 propose the subspecies tashke for these strains but it remains unclear whether this is a distinct subspecies and whether it endures in the overall evolutionary course of Xf strains. Hernandez-Martinez et al., 2007 find the subspecies sandyi causes disease of Oleander, Jacaranda spp., daylily, and magnolia.

Raju 1983 finds Xf without symptoms on wild Carneocephala fulgida, Draeculacephala minerva, the Blue-Green Sharpshooter (BGSS, Graphocephala atropunctata, a vector), Helochara delta, Pagaronia tredecimpunctata, and Philaenus spumarius. Purcell & Saunders 1999 find infections in plants common to riparian zones here often are not motile in the host and spontaneously improve.

=== Botrytis cinerea ===
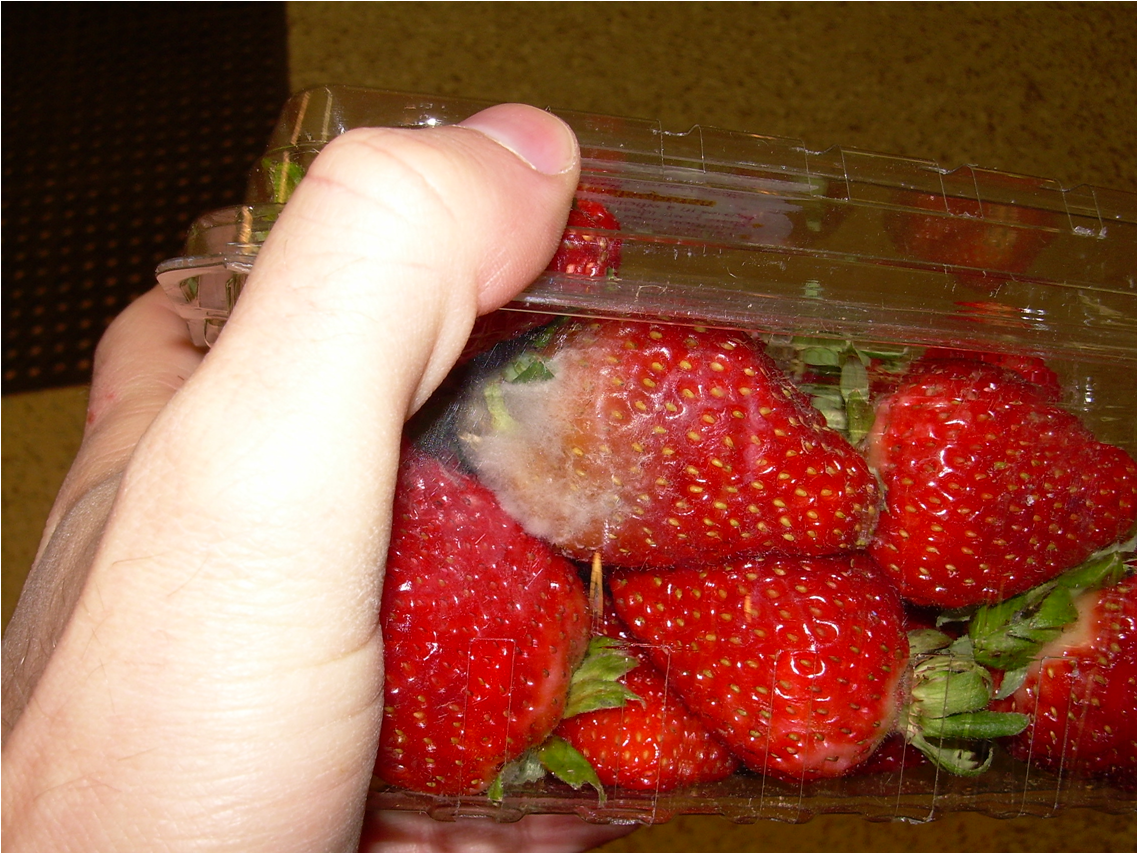

Various strains of gray mold (Botrytis cinerea) are a constant presence in the state's horticulture, especially afflicting strawberry and grape.

Fungicides are used multiple times per seasons and as a result resistance to almost every mode of action is common. Cosseboom et al., 2019 finds the proportion of resistant isolates increased within a single season in conventional but not organic. This shows that evolution is driven by usage in this crop.

Organic strawberry ranches experience very active genetic transfer with conventional strawberry and as a result they have high proportions of resistance. Cosseboom et al., 2019 finds that conventional fields undergo within-season resistance evolution, while organic does not, demonstrating that they are indeed not using the fungicides they claim to not use, and that genetic transfer is not so rapid as to change the situation in a field that quickly.

Ma & Michailides 2005 developed a microsatellite primed PCR (MP-PCR) for genetic diversity in this fungus, especially for populations in this state. Strawberry Botrytis leaf spot was first discovered in 2018 in Santa Maria and reported by Mansouripour & Holmes 2020. Bc was not previously known to produce a leaf spot phenotype in strawberry.

In table grape there is a limit of 0.5% – table grapes can only be shipped if an allotment contains 0.5% or less of Bc-infected berries. Ozone is one treatment option for grape.

Shao et al., 2021 find azoxystrobin resistance is very common in this population. They find it is much more common than in China where azoxystrobin is almost unknown.

B. cinerea is a common cause of postharvest losses in this industry. Due to the need for long shelf life in the California industry – because target markets include the whole continent – and the low moisture growing environments, Petrasch et al., 2021 find genomic selection for strawberry resistance is highly successful. In other environments and markets however this is not expected to be as simple.

Most B. cinerea inoculum is introduced via aeroplankton. Significant protection against this is afforded by polytunnels. Daugovish & Larson 2009 find 84%–90% greater yield and 62%–140% greater marketable yield resulting in $14,000–$18,500 per hectare ($5,700–$7,500/acre) greater revenue due to polytunnels.

Though gray mold elsewhere may be caused by both B. cinerea and B. pseudocinerea in California B. pseudocinerea is unknown on strawberry. However it is found on blueberry in the San Joaquin Valley.

=== Other pathogens of grape ===
Red Blotch Disease (caused by grapevine red blotch virus, GLRaV-3) costs the state $90 million annually. Losses in Napa County cost over $69,500 per hectare ($28,100/acre) across the likely 25-year lifetime of a vineyard, far higher than the $2,200 per hectare ($890/acre) estimated for eastern Washington.

Al Rwahnih et al., 2013 discovered Grapevine Red Blotch-associated Virus (GRBaV) here, a DNA virus of this crop.

Leafroll Disease (grapevine leafroll-associated virus 3) is also economically significant.

The seriousness of Powdery Mildew (Uncinula necator) has been recognized since at least 1859 in the northern grape district. Newton B. Pierce was working in the area a few decades before his discovery of Pierce's Disease, and over the 1860s he watched U. necator spread to the south. Frederic Bioletti called it the only serious fungal disease the industry suffered from, and so it has remained ever since. The first case of U. necator demethylation inhibitor resistance (DMI resistance) was found in this state in 1980. This was only confirmed with Gubler et al., 1996's reanalysis of 1986 and 1990 samples however. Gubler finds that reduced rates prescribed by IPM are responsible for some of U. necator's triadimefon-, myclobutanil-, and fenarimol resistances.

Phomopsis dieback (caused by Phomopsis viticola) is also a major trunk disease here. It is endemic to California.

=== Fusarium spp. ===
Fusarium is a genus of many species which are ubiquitous around the world, including here.

Fusarium Wilt of Strawberry (Fusarium oxysporum f. sp. fragariae) had only been seen once before, in Queensland, in one sample of Winks & Williams in 1966, until appearing again here in 2006 and identified by Koike et al. 2009. As of 2018 it has spread throughout the state. Henry et al., 2017 apply a Japanese PCR-based test of nuclear ribosomal intergenic spacer and elongation factor 1-α. They find such high similarity between the intended – Japanese – target populations and California populations that there are almost no false negatives. There are no false positives on other Fo types (i.e. those not pathogenic on strawberry). Although this suggests both populations have a common origin, that remains to be proven. The matching IGS and EF-1α sequences divide into three somatic compatibility groups. The vast majority fell into what they term SCG1, with a few of SCG2 and SCG3. SCG2 is always a false negative with this test which may indicate the entire group lacks the sequence in question. Although this proves to be a good test, a universally valid test may require finding a sequence specifically pertinent to virulence on the host and not other, incidental sequences.

In early 2012 a previously unknown plant disease (an unidentified Fusarium) and vector (a Euwallacea, preliminarily termed the polyphagous shot hole borer, PSHB) were detected in Los Angeles and Orange Counties. This is especially a disease affecting avocado growers, but also other crops in this state and in its other invasive range, in Israel. In fact although PSHB was noticed on a black locust here in 2003, the associated Fusarium was only detected in 2012 on home avocado trees in LA County. As all Euwallacea in both their native and invasive ranges, this insect prefers to infest hosts in this area in locations which are stressful due to their unnaturalness, such as urban ornamental plantings and orchards.

Fusarium Wilt of Lettuce (Fusarium oxysporum f. sp. lactucum) is common in the state.

Fusarium oxysporum f. sp. vasinfectum is a disease of § Cotton. Kim et al., 2005 finds races 1, 2, 3, 4, 6 and 8 are present. They find race 4 arrived from India in 2003. Race 4 is so common here that varieties are screened for resistance before development or deployment. Unlike other strains it does not require a vector, a root-knot nematode. Race 4 isolates here are more pathogenic on Gossypium barbadense than on G. hirsutum.

=== Alternaria spp. ===
Various Alternaria spp. are significant fungal diseases here and often receive strobilurin, iprodione, azoxystrobin, and tebuconazole treatments. The Ma & Michaelides group has done extensive work on fungicide resistance, including in these pathogens. They have characterized resistance alleles (and in some cases produced molecular diagnostics methologies) for strobilurin-resistant-, iprodione-resistant-, and azoxystrobin-resistant- isolates.

A. alternata has one of the widest host ranges of any fungal crop pathogen and so fungicides are commonly used. Almost all fruiting production of vulnerable crops must be fungicide-treated. Avenot, along with the Michailides group has found extensive boscalid resistance in a swathe from the center down into the central southern part of the state, especially Kern, Tulare, Fresno, and Madera. Although it is also commonly applied in Kings, no resistance is known there.

Black Heart is a common pomegranate disease worldwide. Out of the group of causative species, here Luo et al., 2017 find it is caused by A. alternata and A. arborescens. Michailides et al., 2008 finds the 'Wonderful' cultivar can suffer at a rate of 10% or more here.

Alternaria Rot of Fig is common here. It is caused by various species of this genus and relatives including: Ulocladium atrum, A. alternata, rarely other Alternaria spp., Dendryphiella vinosa, and Curvularia spp. Epicoccum purpurascens causes Alternaria of breba only. (The first, "breba" crop is not eaten but must be removed because it harbors inoculum of all of these microbes for the second, real crop.)

=== Candidatus Phytoplasma ===
The Peach Yellow Leaf Roll phytoplasma (Candidatus Phytoplasma pyri) was first found here in the Sacramento Valley in 1948. The same pathogen may be the cause of Almond Brown Line and Decline.

=== Other pathogens ===
Phytophthora cactorum causes Strawberry crown rot, a common disease here.

The Foliar Nematode (Aphelenchoides fragariae) and Northern Root Knot Nematode (Meloidogyne hapla) are the two most common strawberry nematode diseases here, although RKN is rarely seen by CalPoly Strawberry Center's diagnostic lab. Even rarer are the Root Lesion (Pratylenchus penetrans), Stem (Ditylenchus dipsaci), Dagger (Xiphinema americanum), Needle (Longidorus elongatus), Foliar (Aphelenchoides ritzemabosi and A. besseyi), and other Root Knot (Meloidogyne incognita and M. javanica) nematodes.

Anthracnose occurs on peach, almond, and strawberry here. Colletotrichum acutatum – a soilborne pathogen – is a common cause. Natamycin is often used in strawberry. Adaskaveg & Hartin 1997 identify the C. acutatum strains most frequently responsible in peach and almond.

Monilinia fructicola and M. laxa are significant diseases of stonefruits here and benzimidazole is often used. The Ma & Michaelides group has done extensive work on fungicide resistance in these microorganisms.

Botryosphaeria dothidea is a significant fungal diseases here which often receives strobilurin, iprodione, azoxystrobin, and tebuconazole treatments. The Ma & Michaelides group has done extensive work on fungicide resistance, including in this pathogen. They have characterized resistance alleles of tebuconazole-resistant- isolates.

Figs commonly suffer from Fig Smut here. Smut is caused by various Aspergillus spp. and relatives, including: Aspergillus niger, A. japonicus, A. carbonarius, A. flavus and A. parasiticus, Eurotium spp., A. tamarii, A. terreus, A. wentii, A. alliaceus, A. melleus, A. ochraceus, Emericella spp., A. carneus, A. fumigatus, A. sclerotiorum, and A. sydowii.

Olives here suffer from a wide range of fungal diseases of the Botryosphaeriaceae family, as elsewhere in the world. Úrbez-Torres et al., 2013 finds Neofusicoccum mediterraneum and Diplodia mutila are the most virulent of them on Manzanillo and Sevillano. Moral et al., 2010 finds N. mediterraneum commonly causes a branch blight on several cultivars and D. seriata causes a branch canker. More specific controls than currently available are needed for N. mediterraneum in highly susceptible cultivars, and early harvest may be the only successful treatment for D. seriata.

Avian malaria is present in the state. Plasmodium relictum and its vectors C. quinquefasciatus, C. stigmatosoma, and C. tarsalis are most commonly responsible.

Stripe Rust (Puccinia striiformis f. sp. tritici, Pst) is found on Barley, wheat, and various grasses here. Maccaferri et al. 2015 surveys the world's wheat and finds the Davis Pst populations are unusually heterogenous. That makes the Davis environment a useful experimental location for differentiating wheat genetic resistance.

Stromatinia cepivora (garlic white rot) was identified in the San Francisco area in the 1930s and Gilroy in the 1940s. It continues to be a problem for garlic growers in the state.

Leaf Spot of Caneberry (Mycosphaerella rubi, anamorph Septoria rubi) is common here. It is common on caneberry excluding raspberry, so erect and trailing blackberry, dewberry, olallieberry, and boysenberry. Treatment is simple, almost entirely relying on increased air circulation. No fungicides are registered but any fungicides for § Anthracnose and § Gray mold will work. Copper and lime sulfur work to some degree.

This should be distinguished from Leaf Spot of Raspberry (Sphaerulina rubi, anamorph Cylindrosporium rubi). Although Leaf Spot of Raspberry is found here it is not common in California.

Verticillium Wilts (biovars of Verticillium dahliae) are found here as in any other ecozone. This includes Verticillium Wilt of Strawberry. Unlike every other known Vert Wilt of any other crop, this syndrome sometimes lacks any or any noticeable vascular discoloration of the crown. In strawberry, methyl bromide has historically been vital to prevention, and with phase out, this disease is of increasing concern. In all cases some fumigation is necessary, and if fumigation is not possible then solarization and/or rotation are the only remaining options. Although drip fumigation (fumigation inline in the drip tape) is possible it does not produce the same results, especially failing to reach the shoulders of the beds. Nurseries universally use MB or MB + chloropicrin, while growers may use 1,3-D + chloropicrin, chloropicrin alone, metam sodium, or metam potassium. Note that MB+chloropicrin also provides an uncharacterized growth promoter effect in this crop.

Strawberry Crinkle Virus (SCV, Strawberry crinkle cytorhabdovirus) is common here. Much of the fundamental research into SCV has been performed by a lab at UC Berkeley, including research on mechanical transmission.

Frequent use has produced streptomycin resistance in Fire Blight (Erwinia amylovora) here, first found in the state's pear isolates by Miller & Schroth 1972. This disease is a problem of pomes, including pear.

Podosphaera aphanis is the cause of powdery mildew of strawberry. It has evolved strong resistance here. Palmer & Holmes 2021 find resistance to the majority of the most commonly applied ingredients in the Oxnard population.

Armillaria Root Rot of peach is primarily caused by Armillaria mellea and A. solidipes here. A. gallica and A. mexicana are not thought to be common here, but are common in Mexico.

Tomato infectious chlorosis virus afflicts tomato here.

16SrIII-A is a phytoplasma of apricot here. Uyemoto et al., 1991 found it on apricot in California.

Downy Mildew of Lettuce (Bremia lactucae) is common on lettuce here. The population in the country, and especially in this state, is unusual however: It is highly clonal. As a result, Brown et al., 2004 finds all isolates have the same metalaxyl resistance.

Kim et al., 2015 finds Penicillium digitatum isolates from citrus here have developed fludioxonil resistance, Thiabendazole (TBZ) is also commonly used in citrus here. Schmidt et al., 2006 find point mutations at codon 200 conferring TBZ resistance are common in California.

Karnal Bunt (Tilletia indica, syn. Neovossia indica) has spread from Asia to this continent, and since 1996 has been found in this country. It is present in areas of this state, and Arizona and Texas.

Corn Stunt Disease (Spiroplasma kunkelii) affects corn (maize, Zea mays) here.

Sudden Oak Death (Phytophthora ramorum) is a widespread disease of oaks here and in Oregon, and is also found in Europe. It was first discovered in the 1990s on the Central Coast and was quickly found in Oregon as well. P. ramorum is of economic concern due to its infestation of Rubus and Vaccinium spp. All isolates here and throughout North America have been of the A2 mating type and genetic analysis suggests that although it was discovered here, the pathogen originated elsewhere.

Phytophthora fragariae is a common disease of strawberry here. Weg 1997 shows that the resistance gene Rpf1 is in a gene-for-gene relationship. Mathey 2013 shows that Rpf1 is responsible for most resistance in the Watsonville and Oxnard environments and provides a DNA test to predict performance. No tests are available for Phytophthora fragariae var. fragariae. FPS recommends diagnosis by visual inspection.

Apple mosaic virus, Arabis mosaic virus and Tomato ringspot virus are common pathogens in strawberry.

Raspberry ringspot virus is a common pathogen in California. Diagnosis is performed by cross infection of one of the alternate hosts which are herbaceous.

Strawberry feather leaf virus is a common pathogen. Foundation Plant Services (FPS) offers testing via leaf graft.

Hosts of Strawberry latent C virus include strawberry.

Strawberry latent ringspot virus is diagnosed by cross infection of one of the alternate hosts which are herbaceous or by polymerase chain reaction (PCR).

Strawberry leaf roll disease is a common pathogen.

Strawberry mild yellow edge virus is diagnosed by cross infection of a test strawberry or by polymerase chain reaction (PCR).

Hosts of Strawberry mottle virus include strawberry.

Strawberry pallidosis associated virus is diagnosed by cross infection of a test strawberry or by polymerase chain reaction (PCR). It is one of several viuses causing Pallidosis Related Decline of Strawberry.

Diagnosis of Strawberry vein banding virus is performed by cross infection of an herbaceous alternate host or by PCR.

Tobacco necrosis virus is diagnosed by cross infection of an herbaceous alternate host. Biosecurity Australia considers its presence here cause for concern for Australian stonefruit growers.

Hosts of Tobacco streak virus include strawberry.

Diagnosis of Tomato black ring virus is performed by cross infection of an herbaceous alternate host.

Tomato bushy stunt virus is a common pathogen of several horticultural crops here.

Tomato ringspot virus is diagnosed by cross infection of an herbaceous alternate host. Hosts include strawberry.

Hosts of Xanthomonas fragariae include strawberry.

Aphelenchoides besseyi is a common horticultural nematode disease in California.

Barley/Cereal yellow dwarf virus (B/CYDV) harms native bunchgrasses more than an invasive grass, aiding the invasion.

Tomato necrotic dwarf virus is originally known from Imperial County.

More than 1 virus is usually present in any strawberry plant which has progressed to symptomatic infection.

Lettuce Mosaic Virus has caused severe losses at times up to 100%.

== Insurance ==
As with the entire country there is USDA subsidized crop insurance for the state. The Risk Management Agency provides various insurance schemes and deadlines by County and by crop.

== Research, testing, and propagation material ==
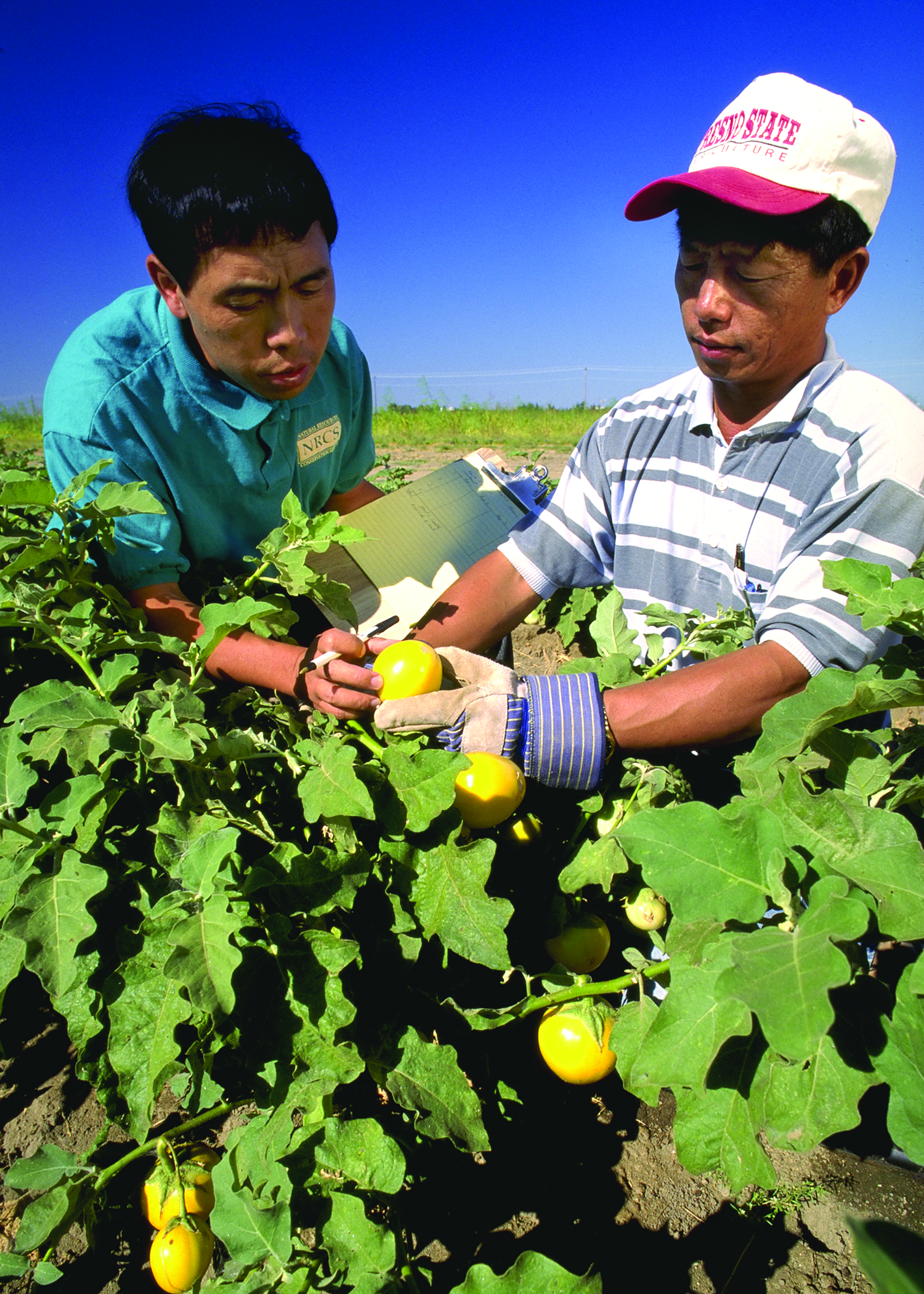
FSU researcher and Hmong farmer

Foundation Plant Services (FPS) is a part of UCD's College of Agriculture which serves the horticultural industries. FPS performs several services including testing for diseases (especially viral diseases), identifying varieties of unknown plant samples, and supplying cuttings (vegetative propagation material) from in situ individuals they maintain. They use a library of published Simple Sequence Repeats (SSRs) known to be relevant to the state's strawberry industry to identify those varieties specifically. California Seed & Plant Lab is an even more active, private molecular lab for the strawberry industry. CS&PL tests for clients here and around the world.

California's experiences with the Vine mealybug, Glassy-winged sharp-shooter, and Pierce's disease have informed the process of creating geographic models for the spread of pests and diseases and their management in viticulture around the world. See § Glassy-winged sharpshooter and § Pierce's Disease.

The University of California is one of the two institutions claiming ownership of the CRISPR/Cas9 patent. This technique has promise for genetic improvement of agricultural organisms. What ever the outcome of the patent litigation, a license from UC or the Broad Institute or both may be required to produce such products in the future.

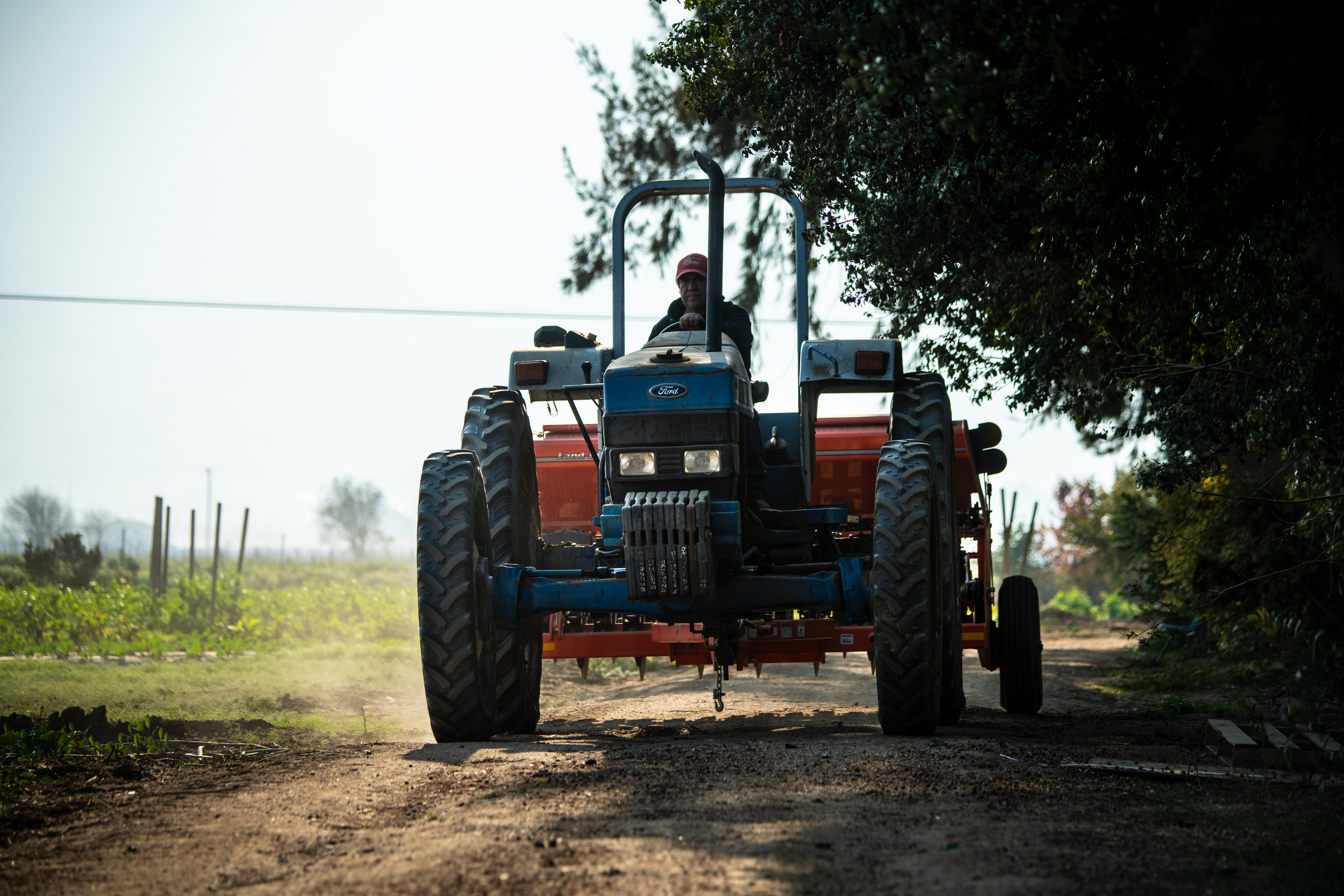
Mexican farmworker learning additional skills in Salinas, 2018

== Labor ==
California farms employed at least 850,000 hired farmworkers in 2024. Many of these were seasonal or part time, with the total paid work equivalent to 420,000 full time jobs. The majority were Mexican-born. Some of these farmworkers are not employed here all year but instead travel to other agricultural employment while California is in the off season.

=== Academic study, Data, and Training ===
The UC Davis Farm Labor program studies the state's farmworkers and provides information about them.

In addition to advising producers, the Statewide Integrated Pest Management program (UC IPM) began training farmworkers in 1988.

=== Regulatory Oversight ===
The state Department of Industrial Relations (DIR) regulates and provides information for workers and employers. DIR's Labor Enforcement Task Force (LETF) enforces such requirements as overtime. UCANR and UCCE also provide information for employers' business planning.

Enforcement of state laws and regulations regarding farm labor and pesticides is the responsibility of the County Agricultural Commissioners.

=== Labor History ===
The union organizing campaign of César Chávez and its impact on the industry has become a well known chapter in American history. His movement was also joined by artists such as famed theater and film director Luis Valdéz. Ecofeminists have supported the United Farm Workers' strikes including Chávez's Grape boycott, especially for their positions on pesticides.

Despite the Immigration Reform and Control Act of 1986, Taylor & Thilmany 1992 found that the state's farmers did not reduce their hiring of illegal immigrants as farmworkers. Indeed, illegal immigration inflows increased in the 1990s.

By the late 1990s the large immigrant population had expanded the workforce, reduced wages and working time per worker. The reanalysis of Khan et al., 2004 finds that increased production of labor demanding crops increases agricultural labor demand, but does not necessarily have to because the same workers could have been hired to perform more hours. For many decades the Immigration and Naturalization Service (INS) and Customs and Border Protection (CBP) left farmworkers alone. INS and then CBP chose not to do any significant enforcement in agriculture, hospitality, or construction. Especially in the Northern Sacramento Valley and Southern San Joaquin Valley, farmworkers had risen to a high proportion of the population by 2013.

The broader implications of intensified immigration enforcement are significant. The U.S. agricultural industry relies heavily on immigrant labor, with undocumented workers comprising a substantial portion of the workforce. In California, estimates suggest that undocumented immigrants make up about 70% of the state's agricultural workers.

Despite the passage of the California Agricultural Labor Relations Act of 1975, by 2012 unions were less popular with farmworkers than they had been before it was passed.

Farmers here were solid supporters of candidate and then President Trump, but were quickly surprised by the rhetoric of the administration due to the labor situation in the industry. As late as 2017 the illegal workforce was still projected to grow. A Pew Research Center analysis by Passel & Cohn expected continued lax enforcement to produce a continued population boom, including among California's agricultural workers. During and after the escalated deportation raids the lack of normal labor opened opportunities for others. Many high school students with farmworker family members quit school to join them in the fields.

The 2022–2023 California floods devastated berry and greens cultivation areas, and impacted worker housing.

=== Unions ===
In 2021, the Supreme Court of the United States under Cedar Point Nursery v. Hassid struck down the right of organizers to enter California farms outside of working hours to unionize workers.

=== Protests ===
- In April 2024, over 100 farm workers protested for better wages and working conditions, asking for a minimum of US$26/hr. In 2024, farmworkers in Santa Barbara County earned an average hourly wage of ~$17/hr.

=== Immigrant Labor ===
California's agricultural sector is heavily dependent on immigrant labor, with a significant portion of its workforce lacking legal status. According to the U.S. Department of Labor's National Agricultural Workers Survey (NAWS), conducted between 2015 and 2019, approximately 49% of hired crop farmworkers in California were unauthorized immigrants. As of 2019, 9% of all unauthorized immigrants in California are employed in this industry.

A 2010 study estimated a total of 165,000 indigenous farmworkers from Mexico and Guatemala and family members in California

Enforcement of labor laws has had little success in improving working conditions. Harrison & Getz 2015 study organic fruit and vegetable workers here and find that working conditions generally improve with increasing farm size. Stockton et al., 2017's meta analysis shows workers were earning two-thirds of the average Californian due to a combination of low wages and underemployment.

Recent immigration enforcement actions have had notable impacts on California's agricultural communities. For instance, a workplace raid in Kern County in February 2025 led to the detention of numerous farmworkers, disrupting local farming operations and instilling fear among immigrant laborers.

== See also ==
- Agriculture in the United States
