= Production of peaches in California =

California is the largest grower of peaches in the United States, producing about 70% of the total.

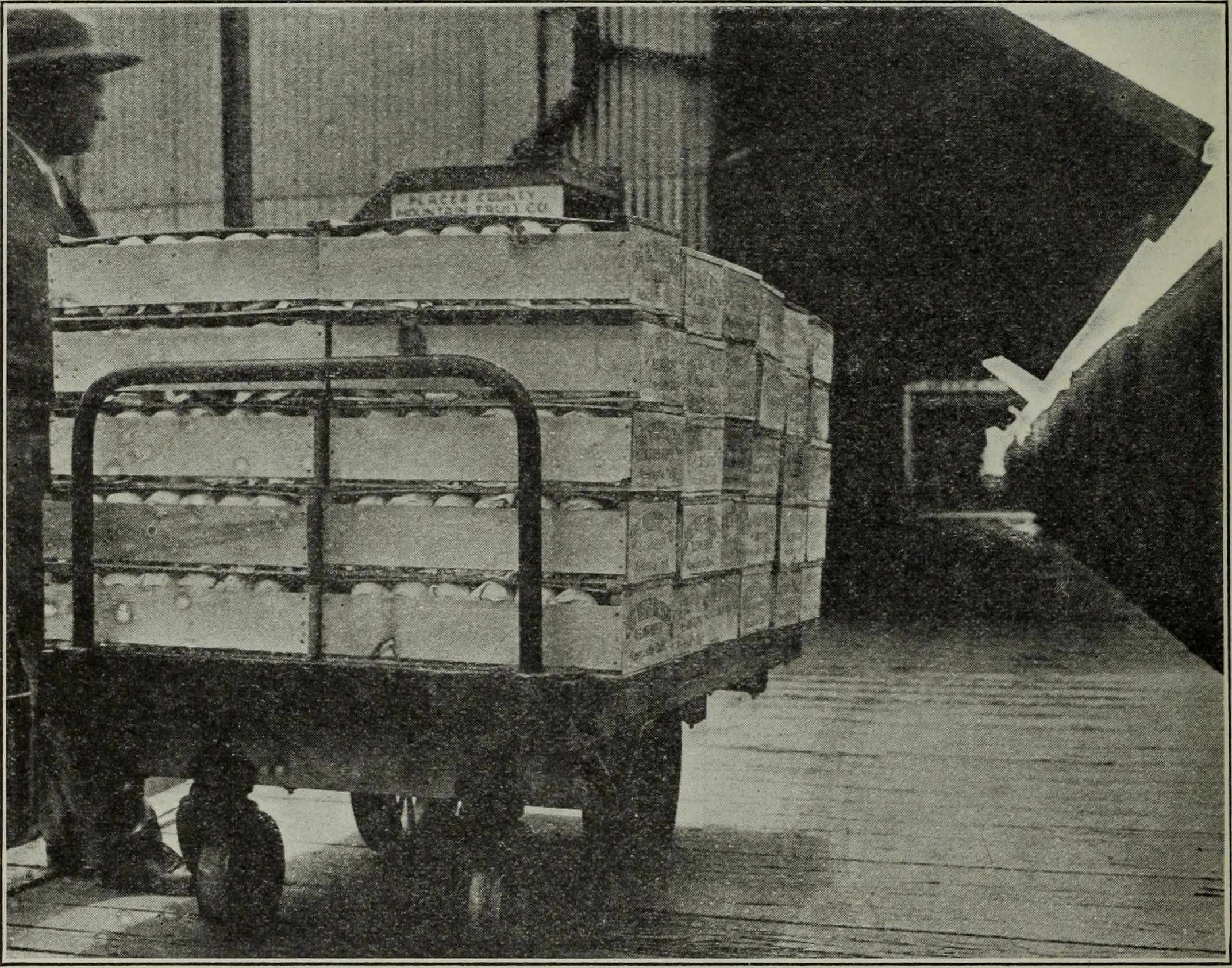
Mountain Fruit Co.'s shipment for eastern markets, Placer County, 1922

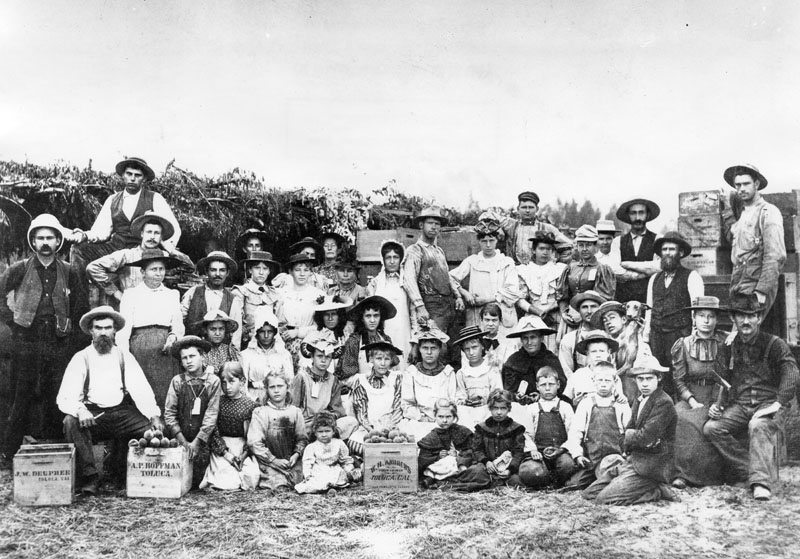
San Fernando Valley harvest, 1890

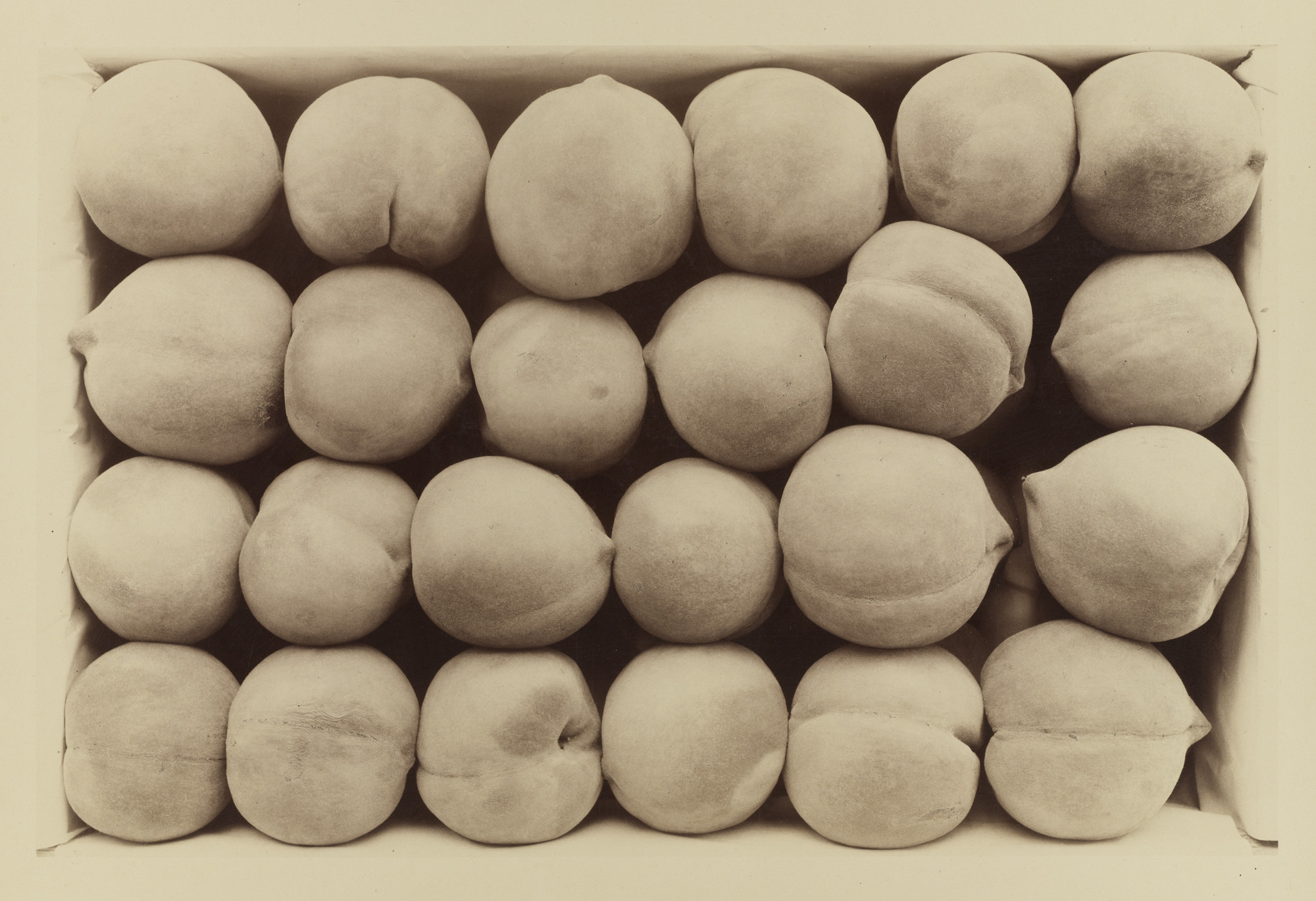
George Clings, Carleton E. Watkins, 1889, now in the MoMA

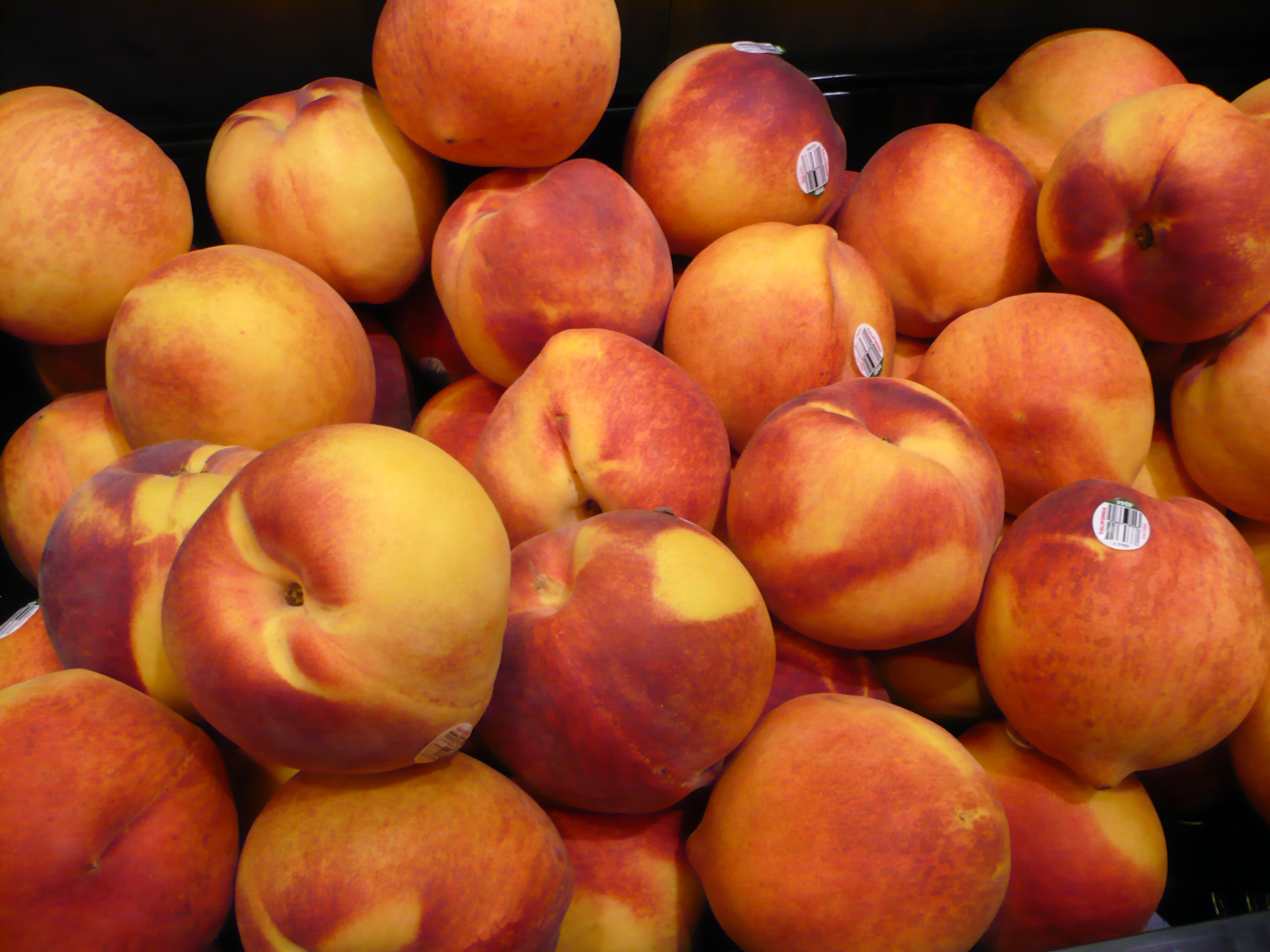
Grocery store in Fortuna, 2014

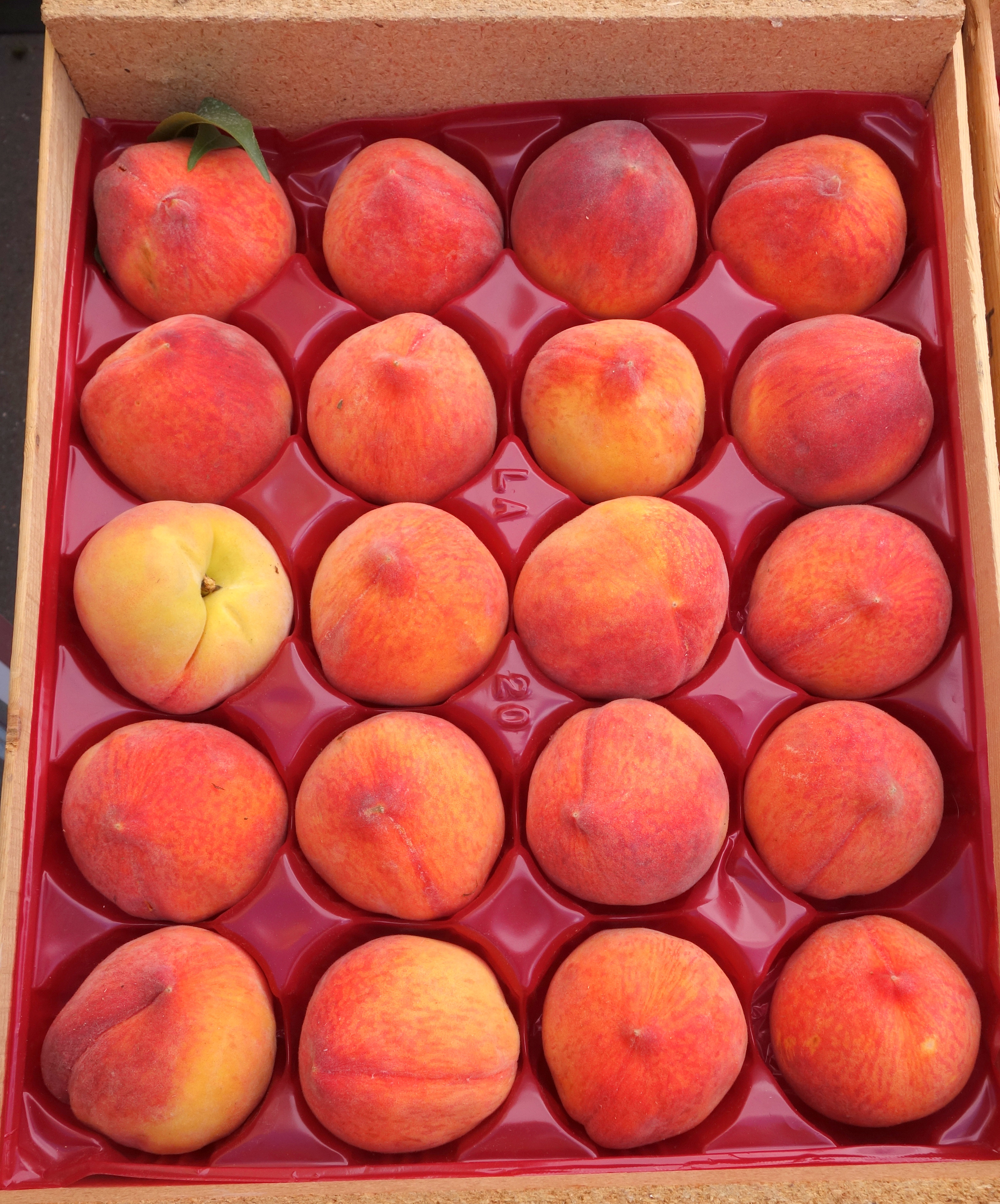
San Francisco Farmers' Market, 2014

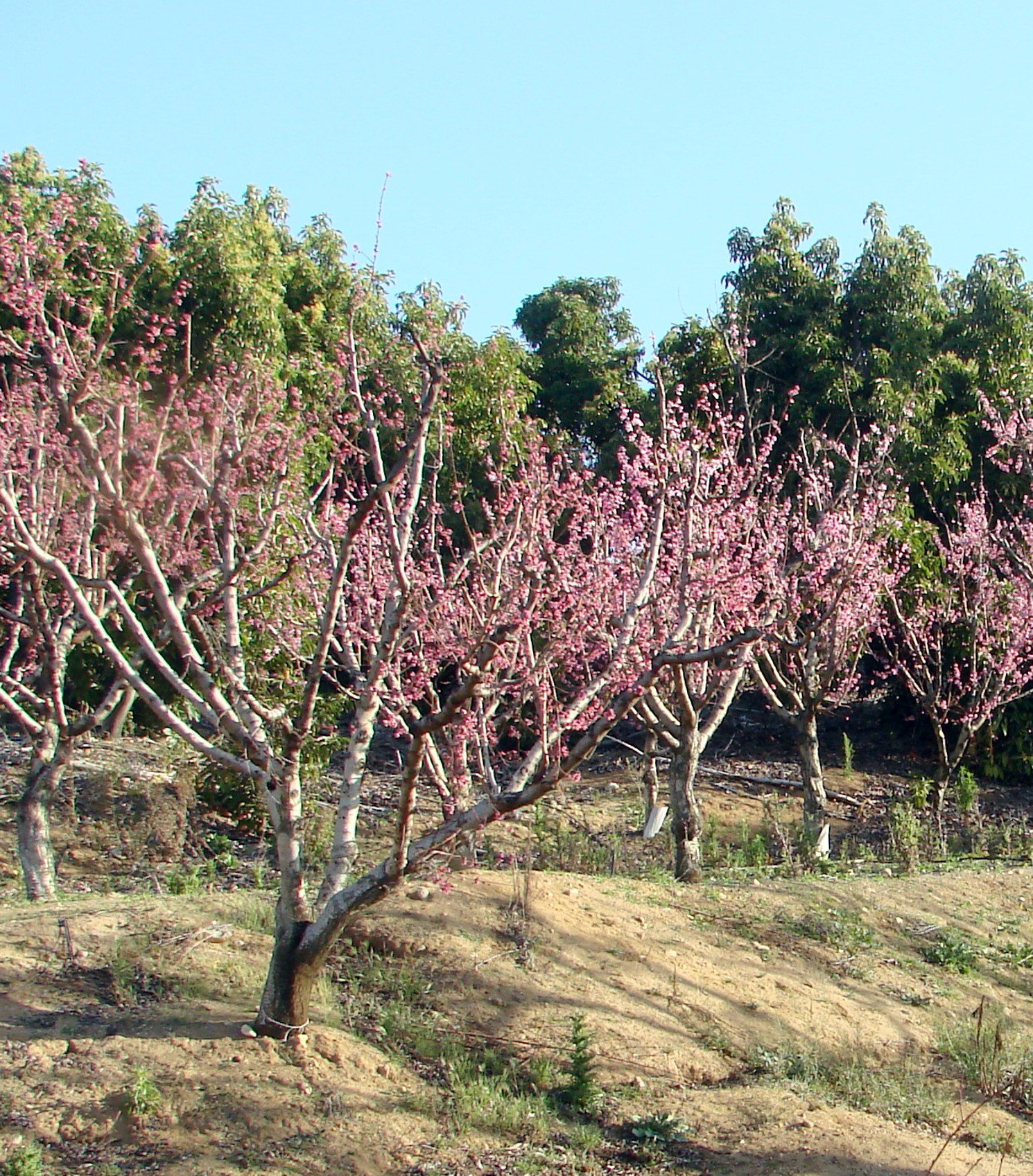
Redlands

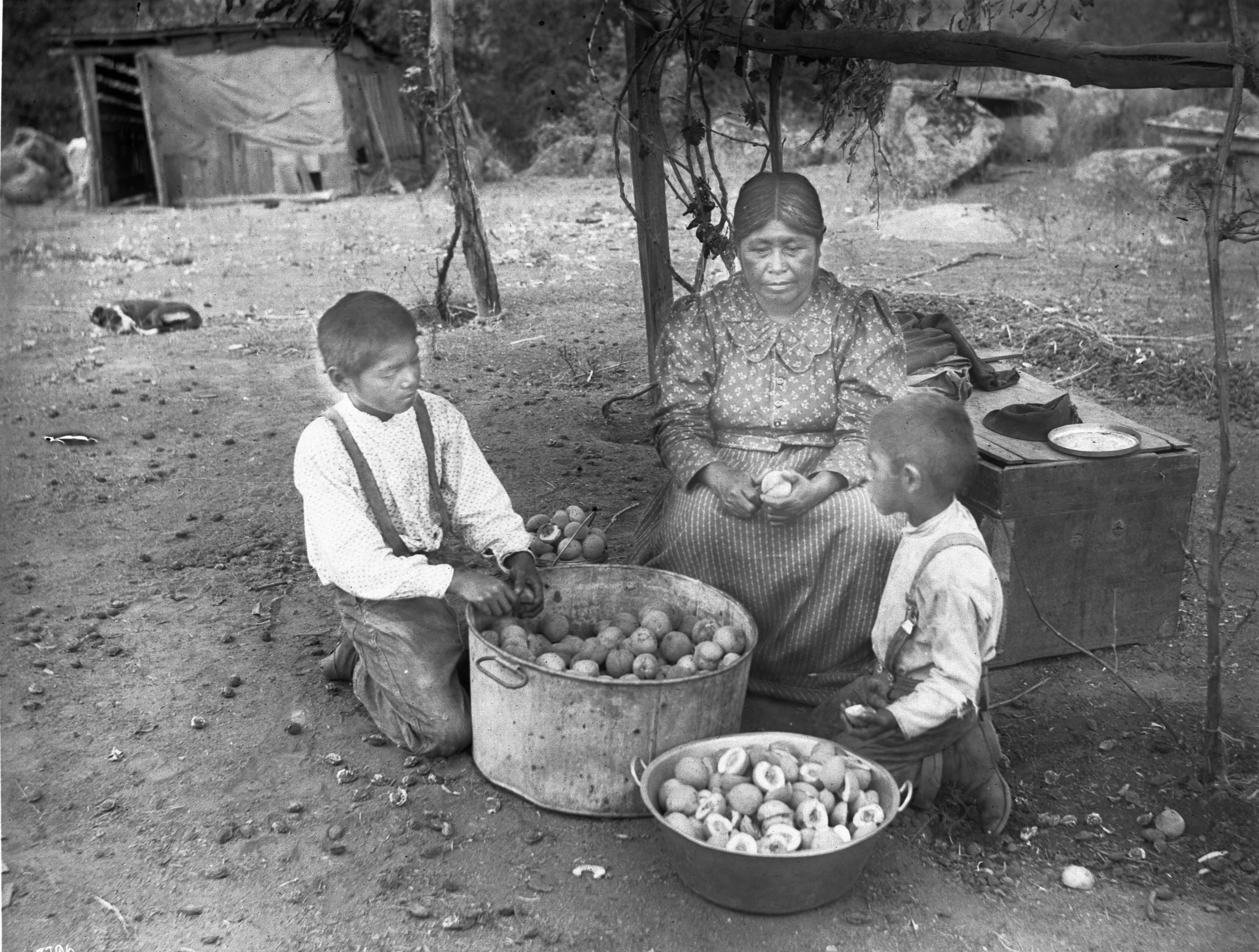
Yokuts, Tule River Reservation ~1900AD

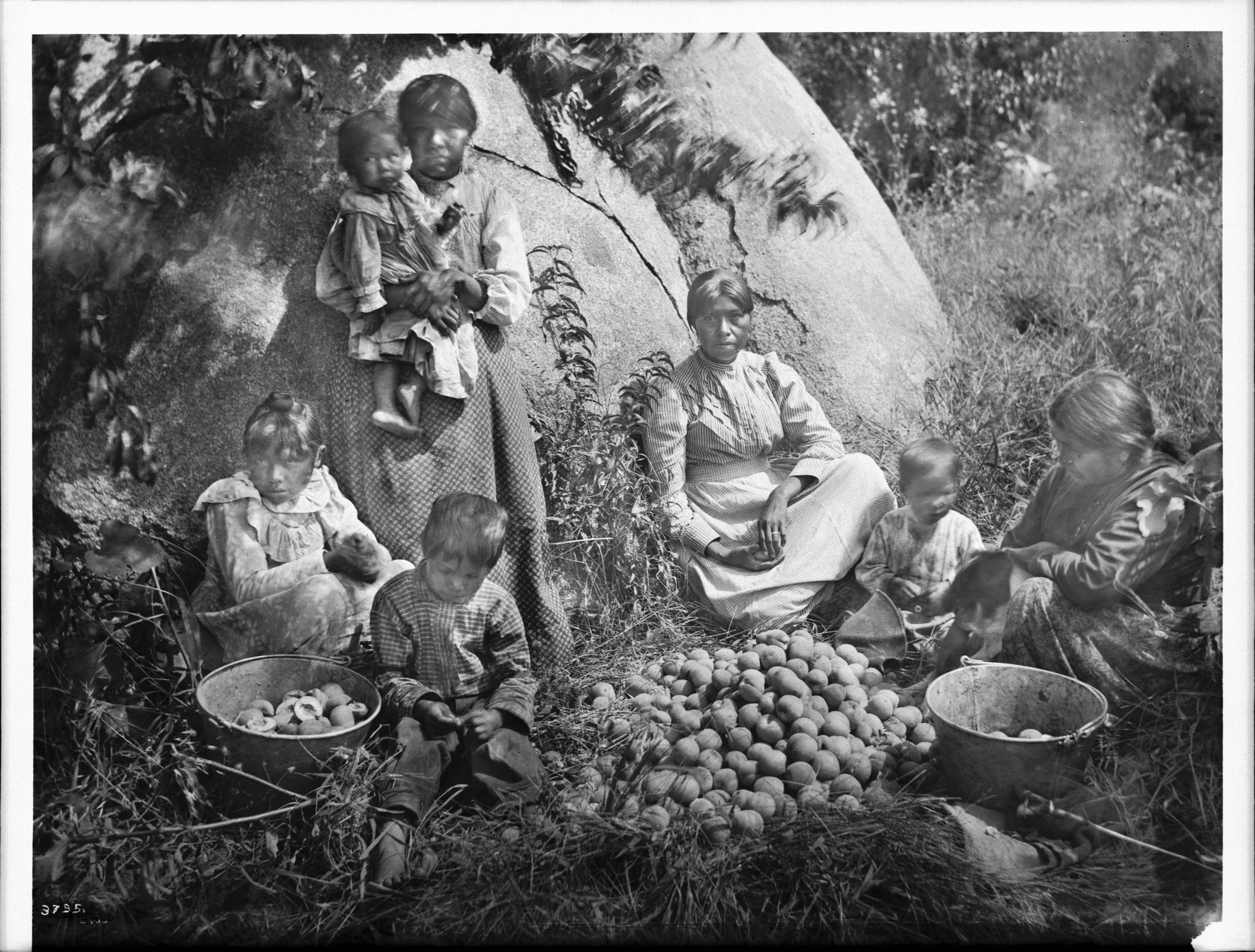
Yokuts, Tule River Reservation ~1900AD

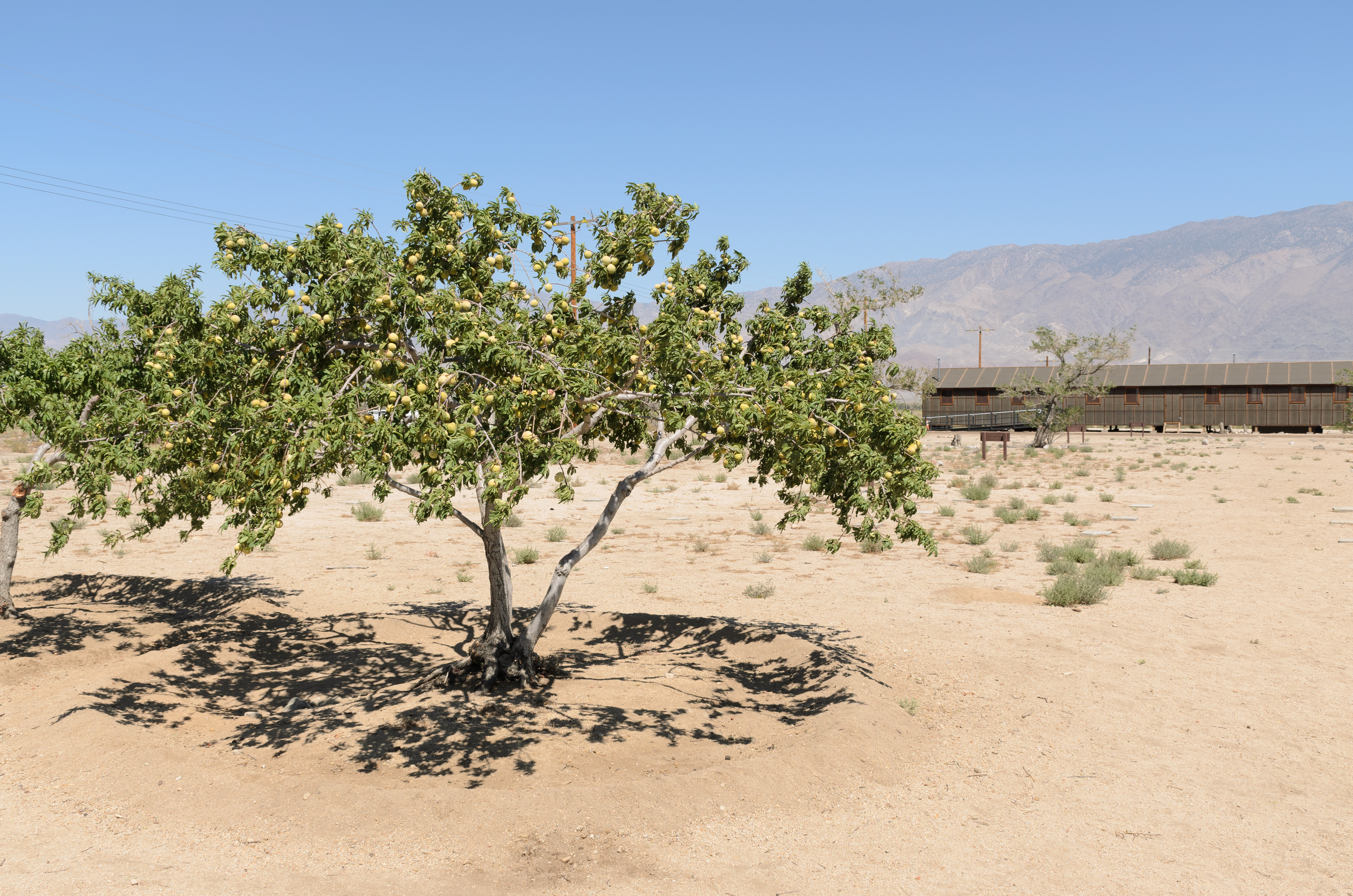
Manzanar

The California Freestone Peach Association (CFPA) and California Canning Peach Association/California Cling Peach Board (CCPA) represent the industry. (The CFPA is a separate incorporation that is operated by the CCPA's staff.) The majority of the country's peaches are grown here, in 2020 468,000 short tons (425,000 t) for sales of $308.3 million. Since 1980 the total value of the harvest has been slightly increasing. Peach acreage has been declining however, down to 73,000 acres (30,000 ha) as of 2020.

In April 2026, Del Monte shut down its major warehouses in California. As of May 2026, California farmers plan on cutting down 420,000 peach trees following Del Monte's bankruptcy with $9 million of assistance from the United States Department of Agriculture.

== Economics ==
In 2014, California led US peach production, followed by South Carolina, then Georgia.

As of 2021 cling deliveries for processing purposes have been on a downward trend for years. From 430,000 short tons (390,000 t) in 2010, delivered tonnage declined to 225,000 short tons (204,000 t) in 2021. Cling yield shows no clear trend over the same time, bouncing between 18.1 short tons per acre (41 t/ha) and 15.3 short tons per acre (34 t/ha). As of 2022, prices of clingstone peaches had been trending mostly upward for several years, from $317 per short ton ($349/t) in 2012 to $518 per short ton ($571/t). In 2022, CCPA (California Canning Peach Association) expected deliveries of clingstone peaches to be between 214,200–232,400 short tons (194,300–210,800 t) from a yield of 15.3–16.6 short tons per acre (34–37 t/ha).

== Breeding ==
UCD hosts one of the major breeding programs in the country. Most of the private breeding programs for peach in the country are found in California, with a significant amount of the public breeding also being performed here but also elsewhere in the country.

=== Cultivars ===
UCANR recommends cultivars for the state:

- Autumn Flame
- Elegant Lady
- Sweet Dream
- July Flame
- O'Henry – Created here and has remained popular ever since.
- Brittney Lane
- Crimson Lady
- Rich Lady
- Spring Snow
- Summer Sweet
- Super Rich
- Zee Lady
- September Sun
- Snow Giant

== Pests ==
See Cal ag § Colletotrichum acutatum for the cause of Peach Anthracnose here.

=== Arthropod ===
Some arthropod pests of peach in California are:

- Black Peach Aphid (Brachycaudus persicae)
- Brown Mite (Bryobia rubrioculus)
- European Fruit Lecanium (Parthenolecanium corni)
- European Red Mite (Panonychus ulmi)
- Fruit Tree Leafroller (Archips argyrospila)
- Katydids (Tettigoniidae)
- Oblique Banded Leaf Roller (Choristoneura rosaceana)
- Omnivorous Leafroller (Platynota stultana)
- Oriental Fruit Moth (Grapholita molesta)
- Pacific Flatheaded Borer (Chrysobothris mali)
- Peach Silver Mite (Aculus cornutus)
- Peach Twig Borer (Anarsia lineatella)
- Peachtree Borer (Synanthedon exitiosa)
- Plant Bugs/Lygus Bugs (Miridae) including:
  - Calocoris norvegicus
  - Lygus elisus
  - Lygus hesperus
- The Prune Limb Borer (Bondia comonana) and the American Plum Borer (Euzophera semifuneralis)
- San Jose Scale (Quadraspidiotus perniciosus)
- Shothole Borer (Scolytus rugulosus)
- Stink Bugs (Pentatomidae)
- Webspinning Spider Mites:
  - See Cal ag § Pacific Spider Mite
  - and Cal ag § Two-Spotted Spider Mite
- Western Flower Thrips (Frankliniella occidentalis), see Cal ag § Western Flower Thrips

=== Diseases ===
Some diseases of peach in California include:

- Armillaria Root Rot – see Cal ag § Armillaria Root Rot.
- Bacterial Canker (Pseudomonas syringae)
- Brown Rot Blossom and Twig Blight (Cal ag § Monilinia fructicola, occasionally Cal ag § Monilinia laxa)
- Crown Gall (Agrobacterium tumefaciens)
- Jacket Rot (Cal ag § Botrytis cinerea, M. fructicola, M. laxa, Sclerotinia sclerotiorum)
- Peach Leaf Curl (Taphrina deformans)
- Phytophthora Root and Crown Rot (Phytophthora spp.)
- Powdery Mildew (Podosphaera cunningtonii)
- Ripe Fruit Rot (B. cinerea, M. fructicola, Rhizopus spp.)
- Rust (Tranzschelia discolor)
- Scab (Cladosporium carpophilum)
- Shot Hole Disease of Peach (Wilsonomyces carpophilus)
- Verticillium Wilt (Verticillium dahliae)

UC IPM provides information about commonly used fungicides and fungicide efficacy. (See also Cal ag § Fungicides.)

Peach Yellow Leaf Roll was first discovered in the Sacramento Valley in 1948, but remained uncommon until an epidemic in the late 1970s and early 1980s. For the causative organism see Cal ag § Candidatus Phytoplasma pyri.

=== Nematode diseases ===
Some nematode diseases of peach in California are:

- Dagger nematode (Xiphinema americanum)
- Ring nematode (Mesocriconema xenoplax syn. Criconemella xenoplax)
- Root Lesion Nematode (Pratylenchus vulnus and other Pratylenchus spp.)
- Root-Knot Nematode (Meloidogyne arenaria, Cal ag § Meloidogyne hapla, Cal ag § Meloidogyne incognita, and Cal ag § Meloidogyne javanica)

== Integrated pest management ==
Regional Integrated Pest Management Centers (Regional IPM Centers) hosts a suggested IPM plan for peach. UC IPM provides even more detailed integrated pest management information.

=== Fungal disease IPM ===
UC IPM recommends treatment timings and resistance management practices specifically for peach IPM.
