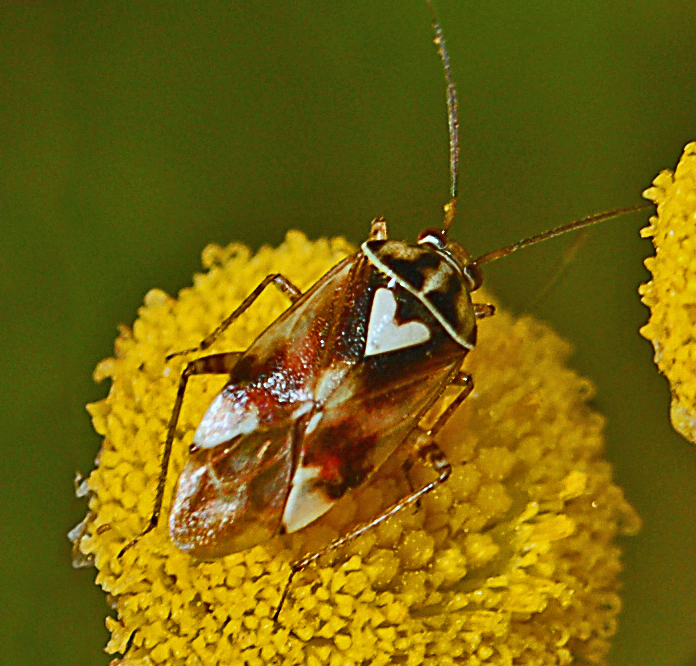
- Adult of Lygus pratensis

Scientific classification
- Kingdom: Animalia
- Phylum: Arthropoda
- Class: Insecta
- Order: Hemiptera
- Suborder: Heteroptera
- Family: Miridae
- Genus: Lygus
- Species: L. pratensis

Binomial name
- Lygus pratensis (Linnaeus, 1758)

Synonyms
- Cimex pratensis Linnaeus, 1758

= Lygus pratensis =

Species of true bug

Lygus pratensis is a species of plant bug belonging to the family Miridae.

== Distribution and habitat ==
This species can be found in most of Europe, in Africa, in Northern Asia (excluding China) and in the Indomalayan realm. These bugs prefers heaths, hedge rows and meadows (hence the species name pratensis, meaning of a meadow).

== Description ==
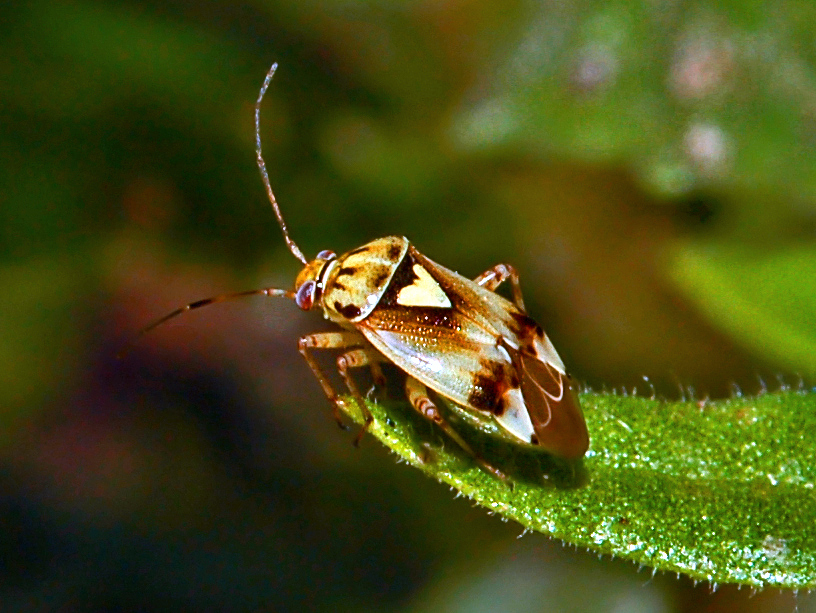
Lygus pratensis

Lygus pratensis can reach a length of 6.1–7.3 millimetres (0.24–0.29 in) in males, of 5.8–6.7 millimetres (0.23–0.26 in) in females. The color pattern and markings of these plant bugs vary greatly. Color may be green, brown or reddish. Usually the males are light reddish-brown to dark red, while the females are green and brownish-colored. The body is oval in shape and slightly flattened. The scutellum is heart-shaped in both sexes. The wings are clearly visible, as they are not completely covered by the hemielytra. Eyes, legs and antennae are usually reddish. These bugs can be identified mainly on the basis of the fine details of the corium.

This species is very similar to Lygus wagneri, but usually it is slightly larger, has longer membrane and a more densely pubescent corium. It is also quite similar to Lygus maritimus and Lygus rugulipennis.

== Biology ==
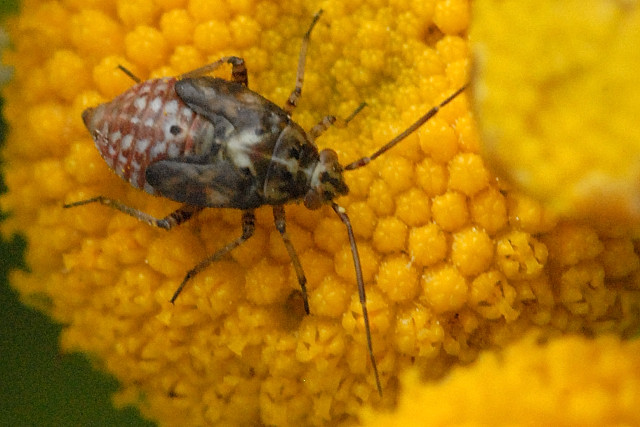
Nymph of Lygus pratensis

Lygus pratensis is a sap-sucking species. Both the larvae and the adults suck the juice of different herbaceous plants, but also nectar of flowers (especially of Leucanthemum vulgare and Tanacetum vulgare). They are polyphagous, mainly feeding on juices of Ranunculus acris, Raphanus raphanistrum, Linaria vulgaris, Calluna vulgaris and of various Asteraceae species, but also on Aphididae species.

Adults are present all year, with one or two generations. The adult insects overwinter in the litter, in moss or under barks.

The females lay their eggs in May and June in flower buds or other plant parts. The tiny eggs are round and white and are deposited in groups. The larvae initially are small, round and bright. In the later stages the larvae are completely green and they can easily be confused with aphids.

They grow quickly and are very harmful for the plants. A good biological control is represented by the parasitic wasps of the genus Peristenus that actively seek the nymphs and lay an egg inside them. When the egg hatches the wasp larva eats the living nymph from the inside.

== Bibliography ==
- Kerzhner I. M., Josifov M. (1999). "Family Miridae". In Aukema, Berend; Rieger, Christian. Catalogue of the Heteroptera of the Palaearctic Region. 3, Cimicomorpha II. Amsterdam: Netherlands Entomological Society. pp. 1–577, pages 121 & 122. ISBN 978-90-71912-19-1.
- Schwartz, Michael D., and Robert G. Foottit (1998) Revision of the Nearctic species of the genus Lygus Hahn, with a review of the Palaearctic species (Heteroptera: Miridae), Memoirs on Entomology, International, vol. 10
- E. Wachmann, A. Melber & J. Deckert: Die Tierwelt Deutschlands. Wanzen. Band 2. Goecke & Evers, Keltern, 2004. 288 pp. ISBN 3-931374-57-2
