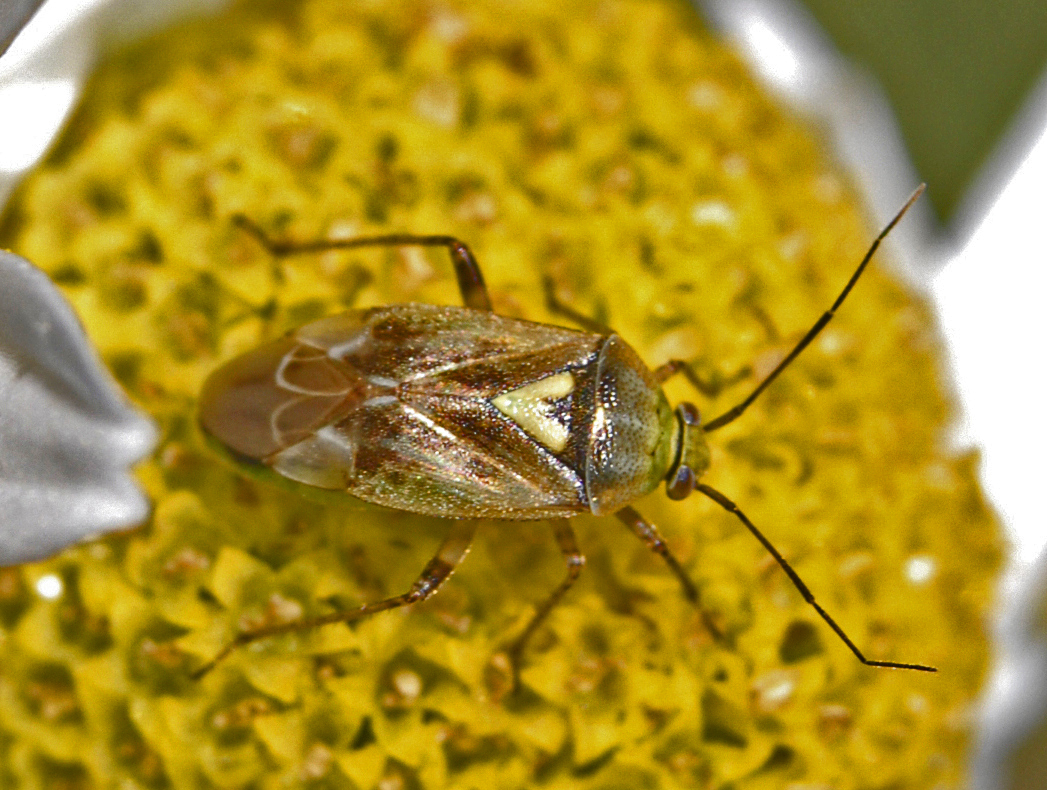
- Adult of Lygus rugulipennis

Scientific classification
- Domain: Eukaryota
- Kingdom: Animalia
- Phylum: Arthropoda
- Class: Insecta
- Order: Hemiptera
- Suborder: Heteroptera
- Family: Miridae
- Genus: Lygus
- Species: L. rugulipennis

Binomial name
- Lygus rugulipennis Poppius, 1911

= Lygus rugulipennis =

Species of true bug

Lygus rugulipennis, the European tarnished plant bug, is a species of plant bugs of the family Miridae.

== Distribution and habitat ==
This common and widespread species is present in most of Europe and in the Nearctic realm. These bugs mainly occur in gardens and in areas with abundant vegetation.

== Description ==
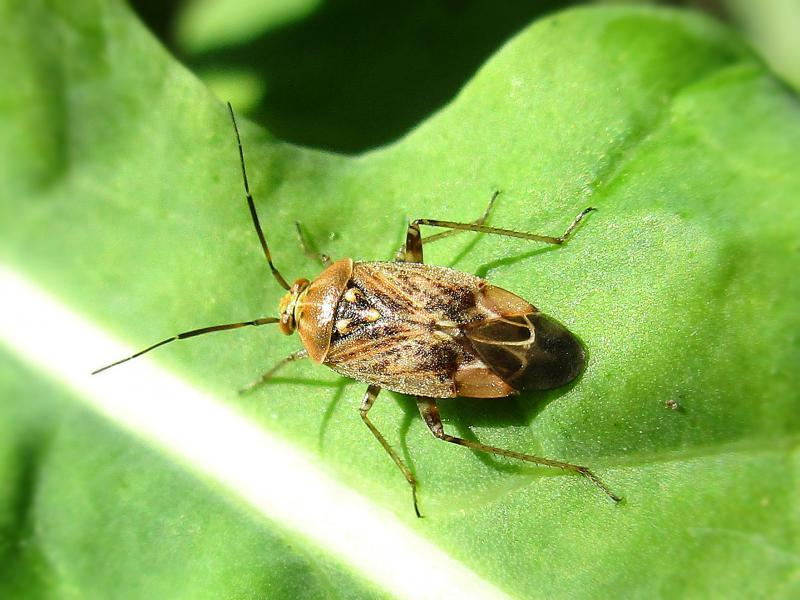
Lygus rugulipennis

Lygus rugulipennis can reach a length of 5–6 millimetres (0.20–0.24 in). These small plant bugs can be identified mainly on the basis of the fine details of the corium, that in this species is very pubescent, with the space among hairs less than the length of one hair. Legs are quite bristly and wings-tips are membranous. The color pattern and markings are quite variable, ranging from purple to yellowish brown. Usually the males are more strongly marked than females, that commonly vary from dark red to light reddish-brown. Lygus rugulipennis is quite similar to Lygus pratensis and Lygus maritimus.

== Biology ==
These polyphagous bugs can be found on many plants. They may feed on Trifolium, Chenopodium, Rumex, Brassicaceae, Fabaceae, Urticaceae and Asteraceae species. They also feed on potatoes, cereals, alfalfa and other crops, so they are considered a very harmful pest. Adults are present all year, but they are more abundant in late summer. They usually winter in leaf litter.

== Bibliography ==
- Nau, B. S. (2004) Identification of plantbugs in the genus Lygus in Britain
- Jarmo K. Holopinen, Risto Rikala, Pirjo Kailunainen, Jari Oksane - Resource partitioning to growth, storageand defence in nitrogen-fertilized Scotspine and susceptibility of the seedlings to the tarnished plant bug Lygus rugulipennis
- Jarmo K. Holopainen - Damage caused by Lygus rugulipennis Popp. (Heteroptera, Miridae), to Pinus sylvestris L. seedlings
