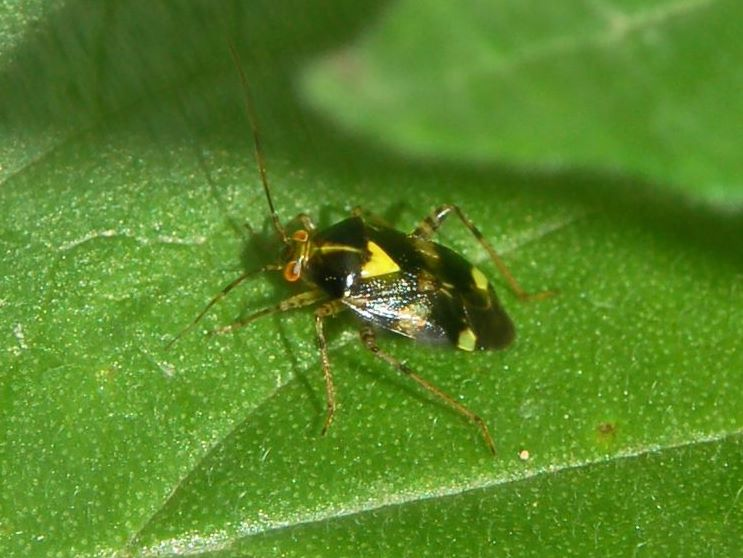
- Liocoris tripustulatus

Scientific classification
- Kingdom: Animalia
- Phylum: Arthropoda
- Class: Insecta
- Order: Hemiptera
- Suborder: Heteroptera
- Family: Miridae
- Tribe: Mirini
- Genus: Liocoris; Fieber, 1858

= Liocoris =

Genus of true bugs

Liocoris is a genus of plant bugs belonging to the family Miridae, subfamily Mirinae. It has only one species.

In 1955 it was briefly considered as the home of the "Lygus bugs" due to the morphological studies of Leonard A. Kelton, but the decision of the International Commission on Zoological Nomenclature (ICZN) in 1963 allowed them to stay in genus Lygus. The species that Kenton described in 1955 as Liocoris are now classified as Lygus.

== Species ==
- Liocoris tripustulatus (Fabricius, 1781)

=== Reclassified ===
- Liocoris borealis is now Lygus borealis (Kelton, 1955)
- Liocoris rufidorsus is now Lygus rufidorsus (Kelton, 1955)
- Liocoris unctuosus is now Lygus unctuosus (Kelton, 1955)
