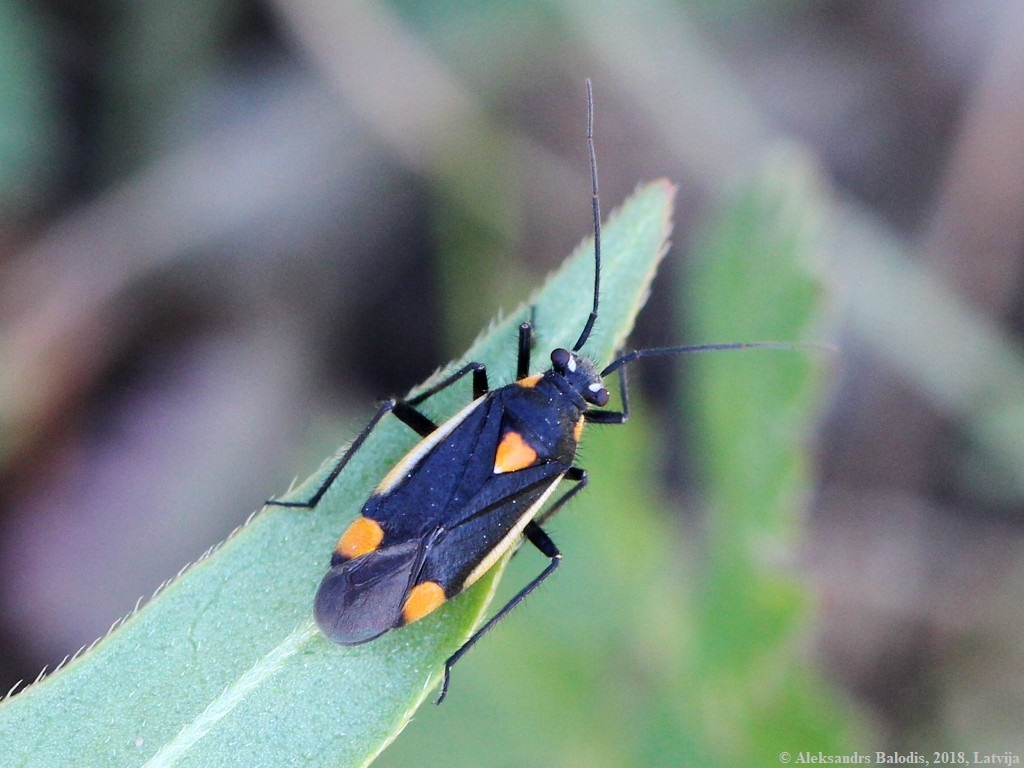

Scientific classification
- Kingdom: Animalia
- Phylum: Arthropoda
- Class: Insecta
- Order: Hemiptera
- Suborder: Heteroptera
- Family: Miridae
- Genus: Capsodes
- Species: C. gothicus

Binomial name
- Capsodes gothicus (Linnaeus, 1758)

Synonyms
- Cimex gothicus Linnaeus, 1758; Capsodes elegans (Reuter, 1896); Lopus gothicus elegans Reuter 1896

= Capsodes gothicus =

Gothic Plant Bug

Species of true bug

Capsodes gothicus, the gothic plant bug, is a species of plant bugs belonging to the family Miridae, subfamily Mirinae. It is found in Europe.

Capsodes gothicus

== Similar species ==
Closterotomus cinctipes
Liocoris tripustulatus
