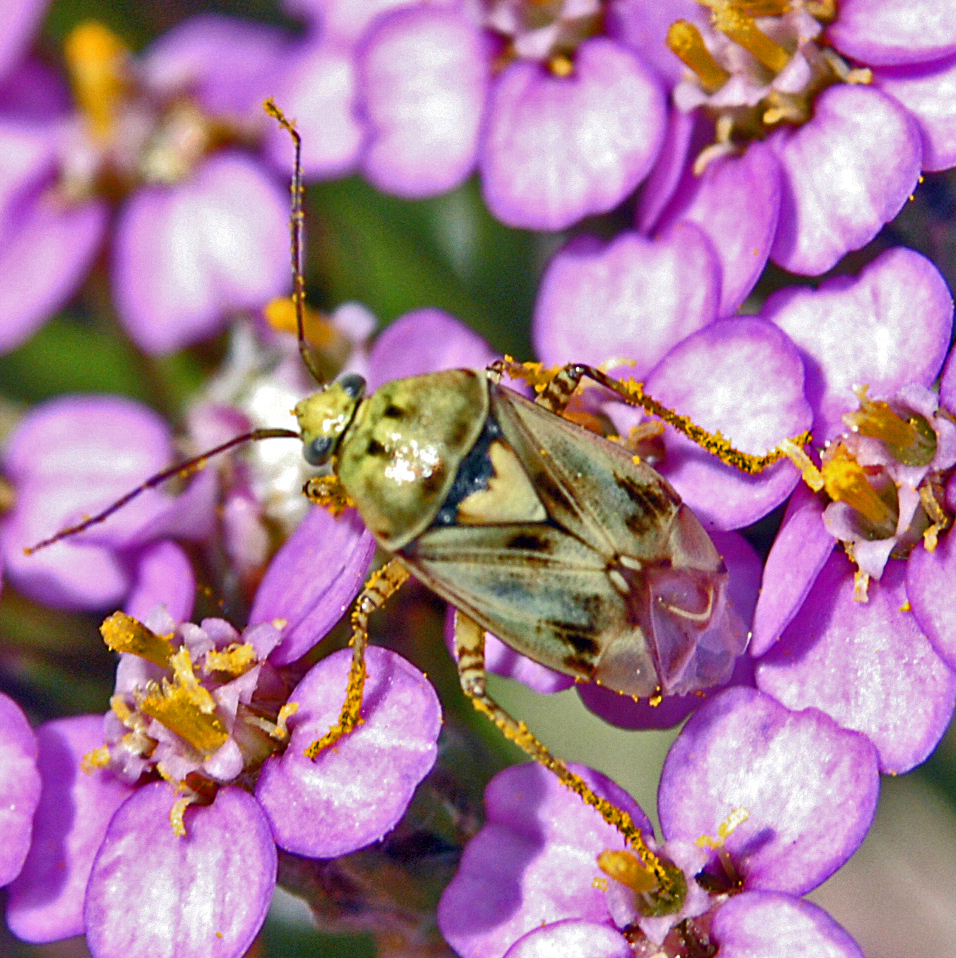
- Adult of Lygus gemellatus

Scientific classification
- Kingdom: Animalia
- Phylum: Arthropoda
- Class: Insecta
- Order: Hemiptera
- Suborder: Heteroptera
- Family: Miridae
- Genus: Lygus
- Species: L. gemellatus

Binomial name
- Lygus gemellatus (Herrich-Schaeffer, 1835)

Synonyms
- Lygus adspersus (Schilling, 1837); Lygus gemellatus f. autumnalis Wagner, 1947; Lygus gemellatus f. innotatus Polentz, 1954

= Lygus gemellatus =

Species of true bug

Lygus gemellatus is a species of plant-feeding insects in the family Miridae.

== Distribution and habitat ==
This species is widespread in most of Europe and in the Oriental realm. These bugs can be found mainly along roadsides and on meadows.

== Description ==
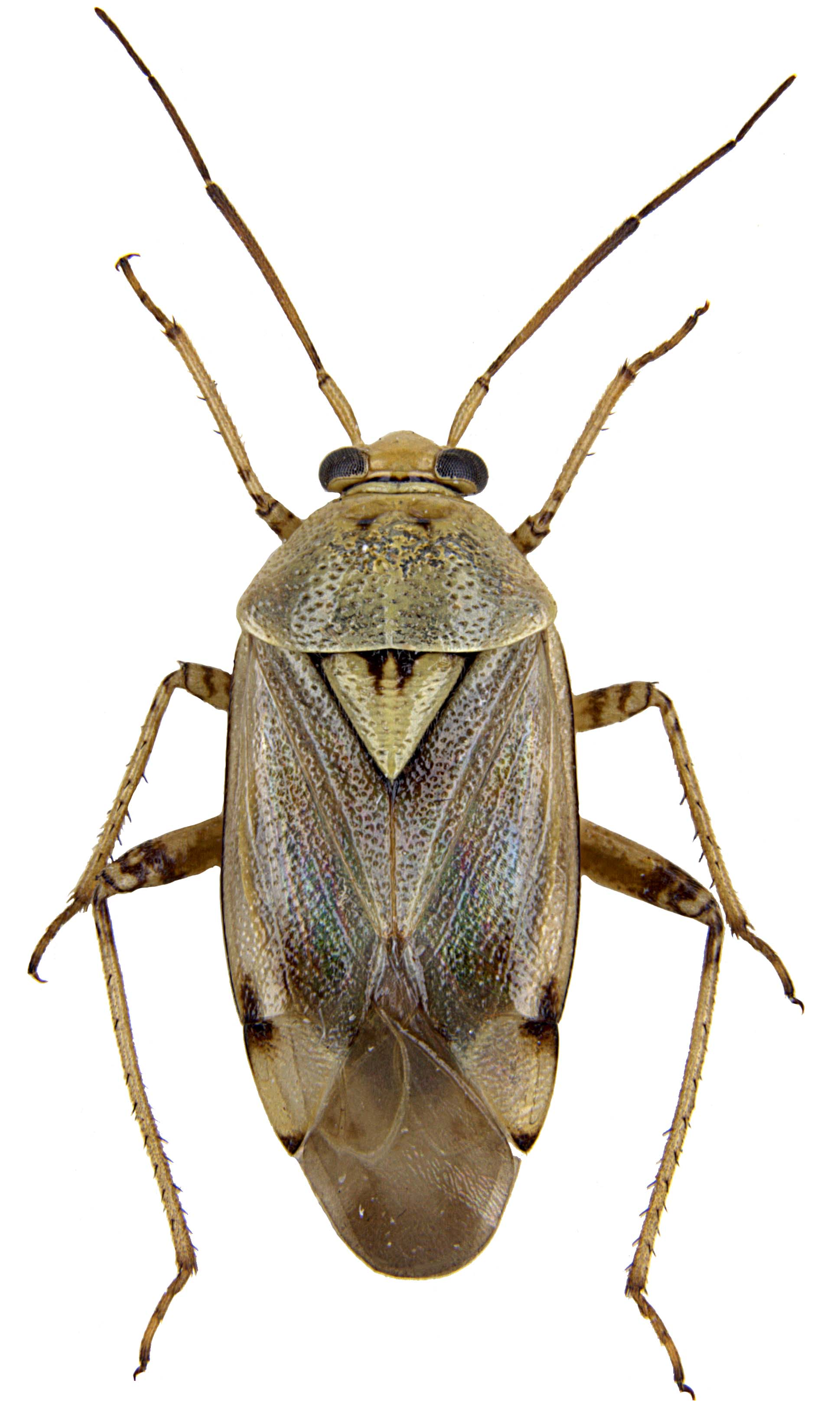
Lygus gemellatus, museum specimen

Lygus gemellatus can reach a length of 5.5–6.2 millimetres (0.22–0.24 in) in males, of 5.2–5.7 millimetres (0.20–0.22 in) in females. These bugs are usually pale grayish green, sometimes with brownish or reddish tinge. Black spot on scutellum usually are bifid apically. However, in this species color and of dark patterns on pronotum and scutellum shows high variability. Corium has black spots at the margin and cuneus has a black distal angle. Membrane is smoke gray, with yellowish-gray veins. Legs are yellowish-gray to brown. Femora have two distal black rings, while tibias show black thorns.

== Biology ==
These plant-feeding insects have two annual generations. They overwinter as imago. Adults can be found from June to September. They are polyphagous and develop on a large scale on agricultural crops, damaging mainly the cereal and leguminous crops. They also feed on Artemisia vulgaris (juices), on Tanacetum vulgare (nectar) and on Medicago sativa.
