= Lygus keltoni =

Scientific classification
- Kingdom: Animalia
- Phylum: Arthropoda
- Class: Insecta
- Order: Hemiptera
- Suborder: Heteroptera
- Family: Miridae
- Tribe: Mirini
- Genus: Lygus
- Species: L. keltoni

Binomial name
- Lygus keltoni Schwartz in Schwartz & Foottit, 1998

Species of true bug

Lygus keltoni is a species of plant bug in the family Miridae. It is found in Central America and North America.
