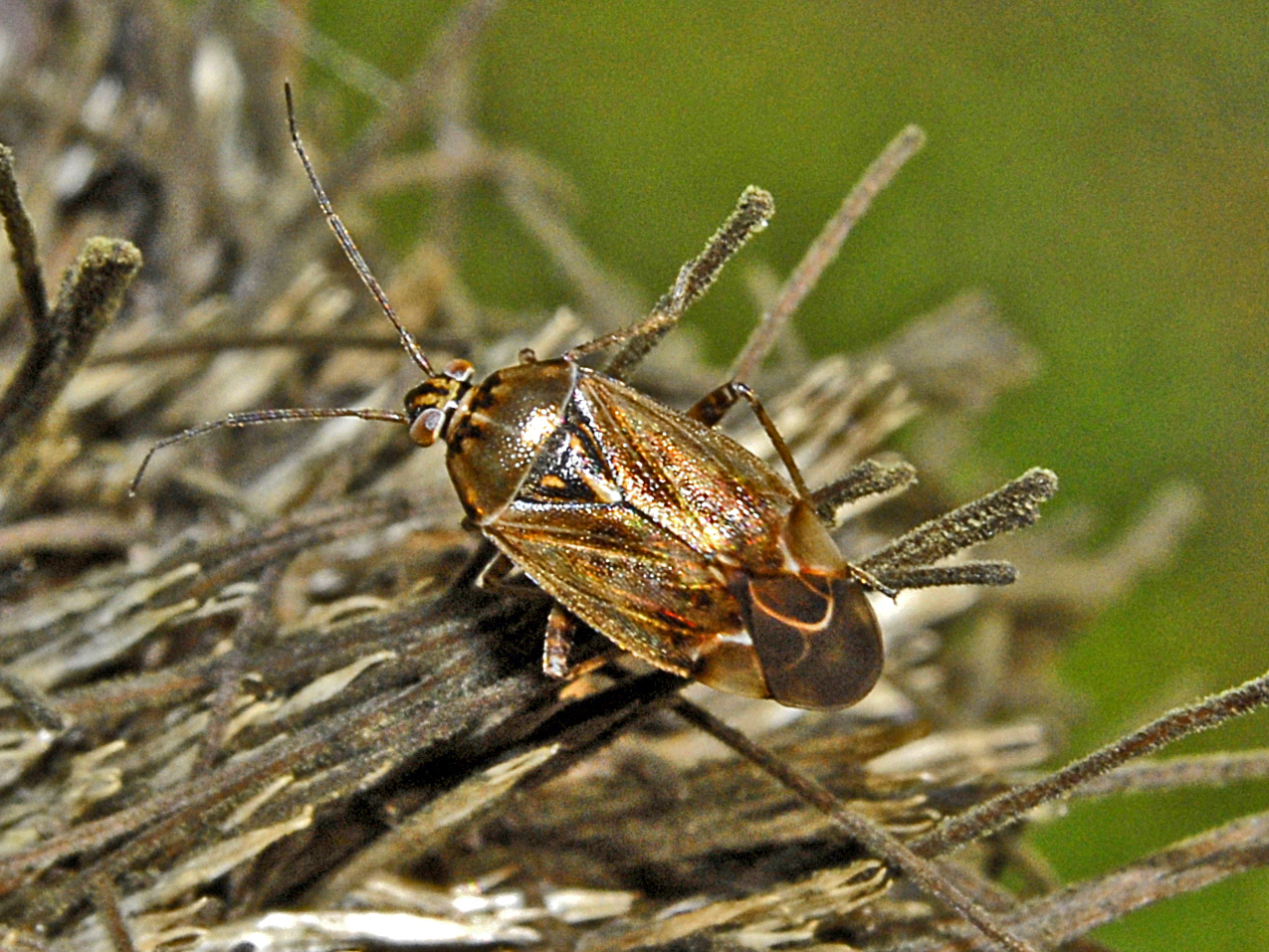

Scientific classification
- Kingdom: Animalia
- Phylum: Arthropoda
- Class: Insecta
- Order: Hemiptera
- Suborder: Heteroptera
- Family: Miridae
- Genus: Lygus
- Species: L. wagneri

Binomial name
- Lygus wagneri Remane, 1955

Synonyms
- Exolygus wagneri Remane, 1955

= Lygus wagneri =

Species of true bug

Lygus wagneri is a species of plant bug belonging to the family Miridae, subfamily Mirinae.

== Description ==
Lygus wagneri can reach a length of 5.4–7 millimetres (0.21–0.28 in). These bugs have a golden gray to olive brown coloration, with small reddish areas. Head shows longitudinal dark brown lines between the eyes. The antennae are greyish brown. Scutellum has a W-shaped dark drawing.

This species is extremely similar to Lygus pratensis, although on average it is slightly smaller, with a shorter membrane. The corium is less densely pubescent.

== Biology ==
Lygus wagneri has two generations per year. It has an incomplete metamorphosis, the transition from newly hatched larvae to the sexually mature insects gradually goes through several stages. It is a polyphagous species, mainly feeding on nectar of Tanacetum vulgare and on juices of Asteraceae, Urtica dioica, Rumex obtusifolius, Hieracium and Hypericum.

== Distribution and habitat ==
This species is widespread in most of Europe. It prefers meadows and open, uncultivated localities.
