= Lygus abroniae =

Scientific classification
- Kingdom: Animalia
- Phylum: Arthropoda
- Class: Insecta
- Order: Hemiptera
- Suborder: Heteroptera
- Family: Miridae
- Genus: Lygus
- Species: L. abroniae

Binomial name
- Lygus abroniae Van Duzee, 1918

Species of true bug

Lygus abroniae is a species in the family Miridae ("plant bugs"), in the order Hemiptera ("true bugs, cicadas, hoppers, aphids and allies"). It is found in North America.
