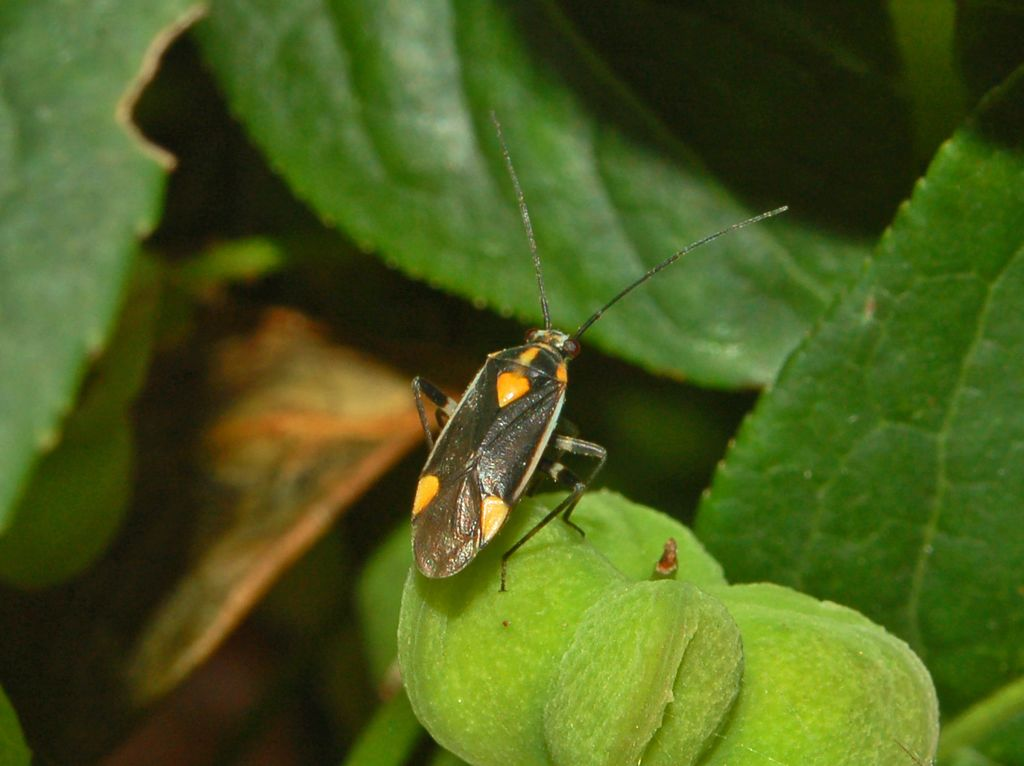
- Upperside
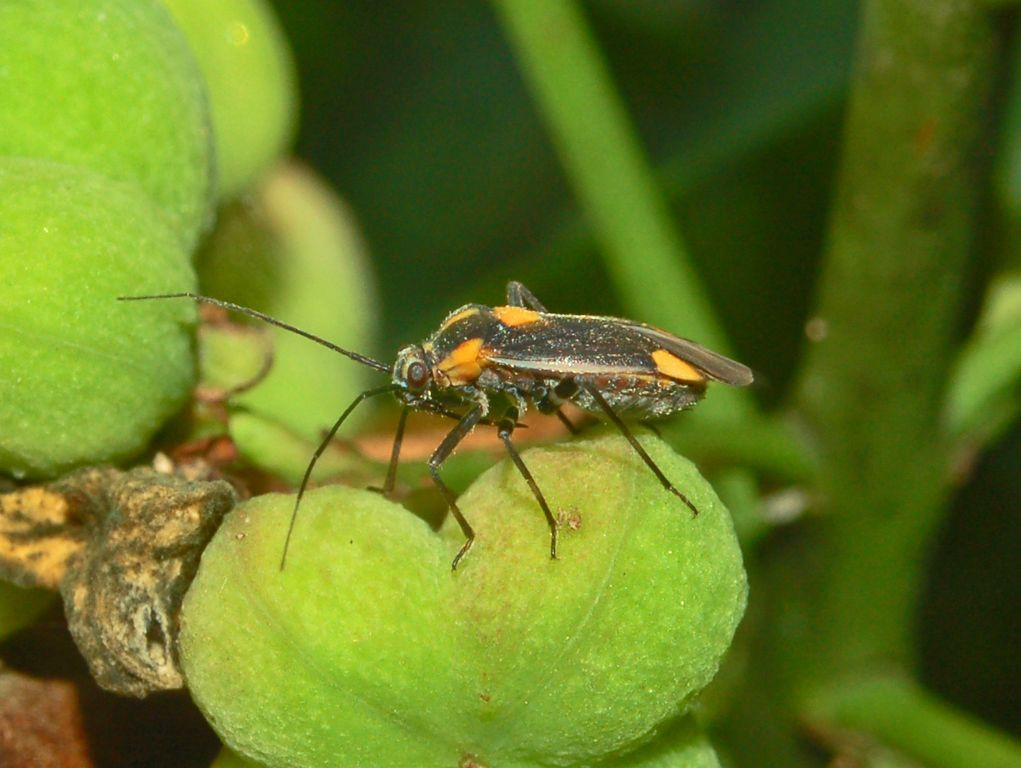
- Side view

Scientific classification
- Kingdom: Animalia
- Phylum: Arthropoda
- Class: Insecta
- Order: Hemiptera
- Suborder: Heteroptera
- Family: Miridae
- Genus: Capsodes
- Species: C. flavomarginatus

Binomial name
- Capsodes flavomarginatus (Donovan, 1798)

Synonyms
- Cimex flavomarginatus Donovan, 1798

= Capsodes flavomarginatus =

Species of true bug

Capsodes flavomarginatus is a species of plant bug belonging to the family Miridae, subfamily Mirinae.

== Distribution ==
This species can be found in most of Europe, but not in the very north. It is present in Belgium, British Isles, France, Germany, Ireland, Italy, Liechtenstein, Portugal, Spain and Switzerland.

== Habitat ==
These bugs inhabit dry open lands, glades, damp woodlands, open marshes and the edges of woodlands.

== Description ==
Capsodes flavomarginatus can reach a length of 6.9–7.7 millimetres (0.27–0.30 in). Body of these bugs is quite elongated and the dorsal surface is covered with fine clear bristles. They are usually black or dark brown, with yellow-orange markings on the pronotum, scutellum and on the tips of the hemielytra. Membrane is dark brown. Legs are black or dark brown, often with bright rings.

== Biology ==
The adult bugs can be found from May to August. They are often found on common cow-wheat (Melampyrum pratense). They feed mostly on members of the Faboideae (Papilionaceae), notably clover (Trifolium), vetches (Vicia), Cytisus scoparius, Sarothamnus scoparius and deervetches (Lotusspecies). A recorded host plant is also Quercus pedonculata (Fagaceae). These bugs are also predators, mainly on aphids and small fles. The eggs overwinter.
