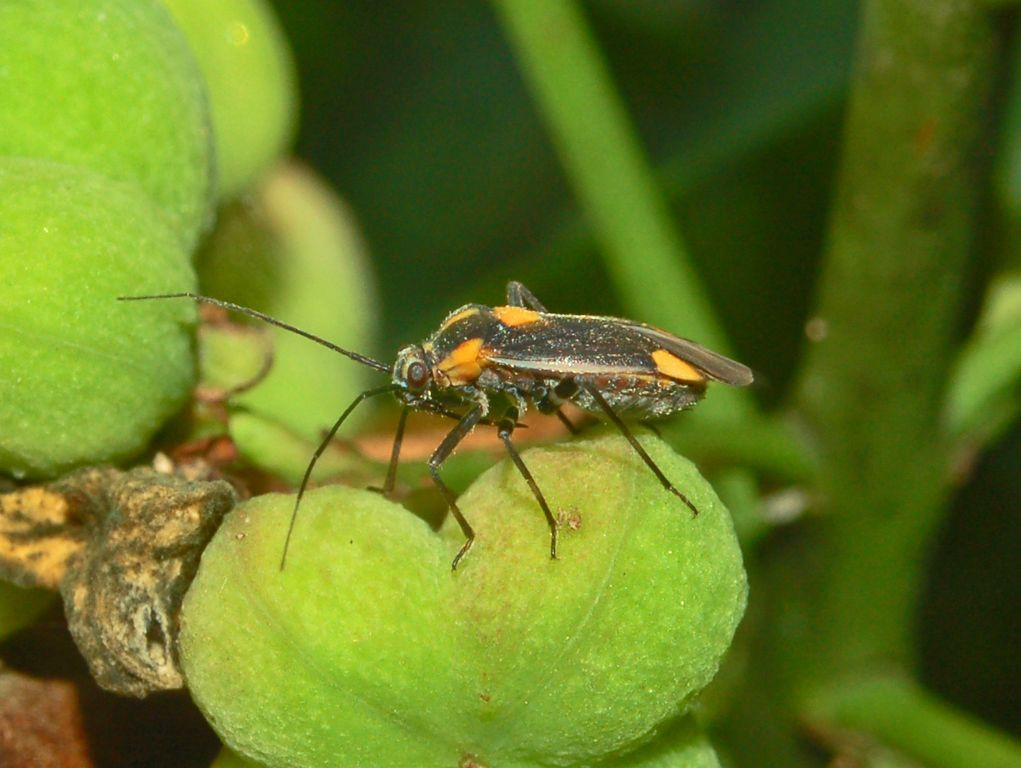
- Capsodes flavomarginatus

Scientific classification
- Kingdom: Animalia
- Phylum: Arthropoda
- Class: Insecta
- Order: Hemiptera
- Suborder: Heteroptera
- Family: Miridae
- Subfamily: Mirinae
- Tribe: Mirini
- Genus: Capsodes; Dahlbom, 1850

= Capsodes =

Genus of true bugs

Capsodes is a genus of plant bugs belonging to the family Miridae, subfamily Mirinae.

== Species ==
Capsodes gothicus

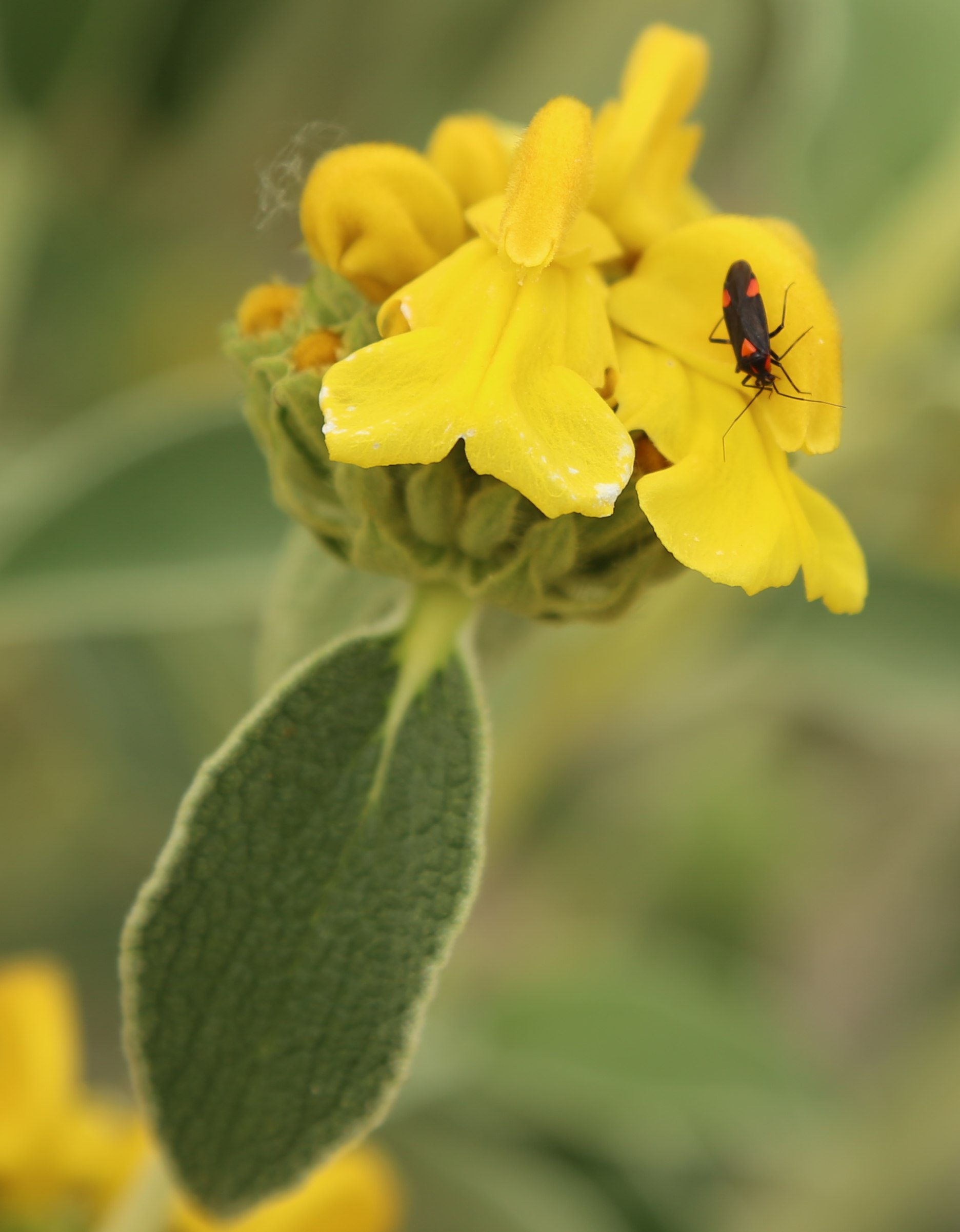
Capsodes mat (Rossi, 1790) over Phlomis plant

- Capsodes bicolor (Fieber, 1864)
- Capsodes flavomarginatus (Donovan, 1798)
- Capsodes gothicus (Linnaeus, 1758)
- Capsodes mat (Rossi, 1790)
- Capsodes robustus Wagner, 1951
- Capsodes sulcatus (Fieber, 1861)
- Capsodes vittiventris (Puton, 1883)
