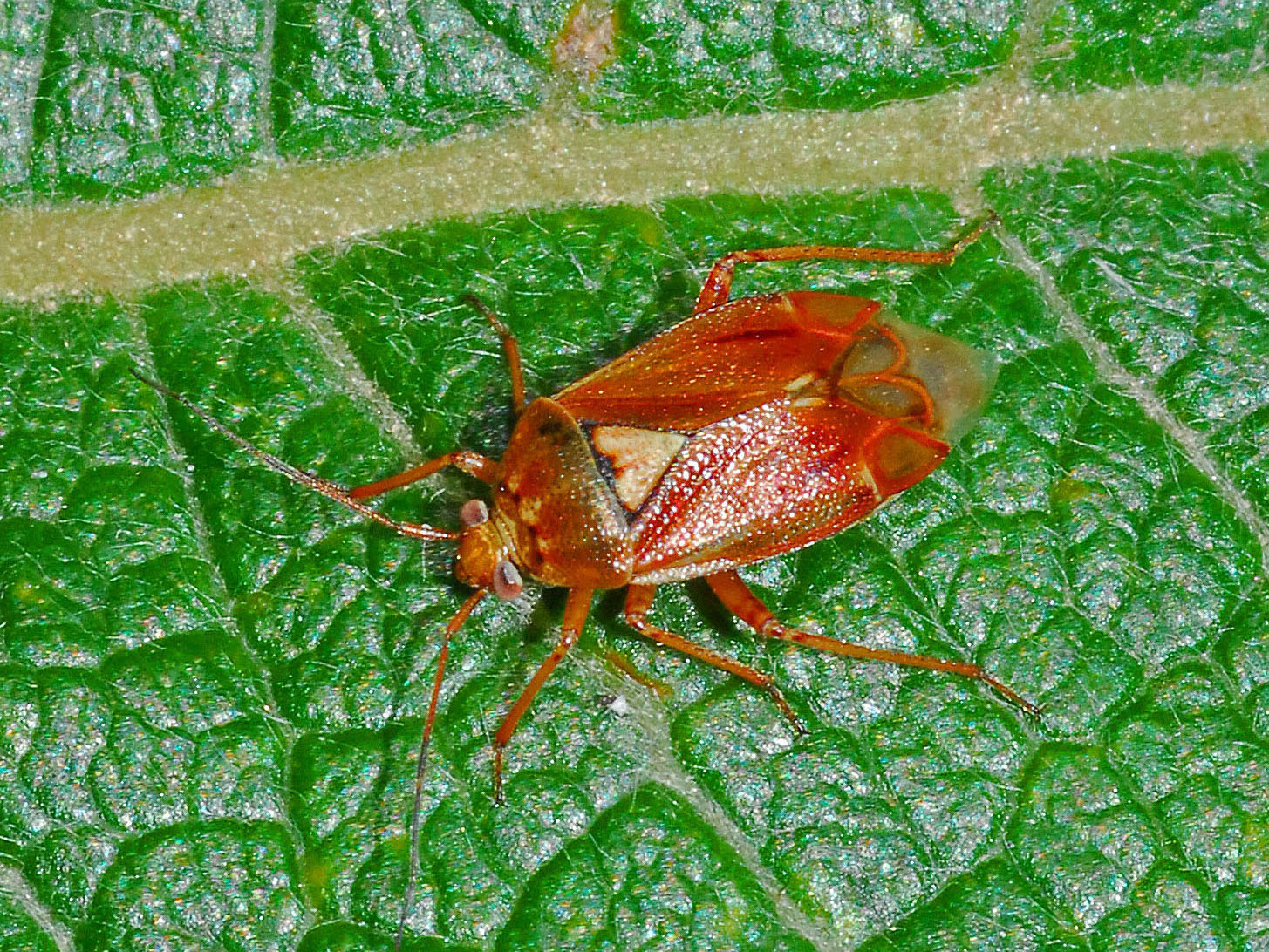
- Lygus punctatus. Adult

Scientific classification
- Kingdom: Animalia
- Phylum: Arthropoda
- Class: Insecta
- Order: Hemiptera
- Suborder: Heteroptera
- Family: Miridae
- Genus: Lygus
- Species: L. punctatus

Binomial name
- Lygus punctatus (Zetterstedt, 1838)

Synonyms
- List: Liocoris columbiensis Lindberg, 1959; Lygus campestris fuscorubra Strobl, 1900; Lygus columbiensis Knight, 1917; Lygus franzi Wagner, 1949; Lygus fuscoruber Strobl, 1900; Lygus rutilans Horvath, 1888; Lygus rutilans franzi Wagner, 1949; Lygus superiorensis Knight, 1917; Lygus (Exolygus) punctatus Servadei, 1972; Lygus (Lygus) punctatus Stys and Stusak, 1960; Phytocoris punctata Zetterstedt, 1838

= Lygus punctatus =

Species of true bug

Lygus punctatus is a species of plant bug in the family Miridae.

== Distribution ==
This species can be found in most Europe and Northern Asia (excluding China), North America, and Southern Asia.

== Description ==
Lygus punctatus can reach a body length of about 6–7 mm (0.24–0.28 in). These bugs have shining and more or less distinct reddish, orange-red or brownish red pronotum and hemelytra. Lateral margin of pronotum is rounded. Scutellum is deeply punctate and not swollen. Middle of corium is less densely and less coarsely punctate than other parts of hemelytra.

== Biology ==
Adults have been recorded highly abundant on alfalfa (Medicago sativa).
