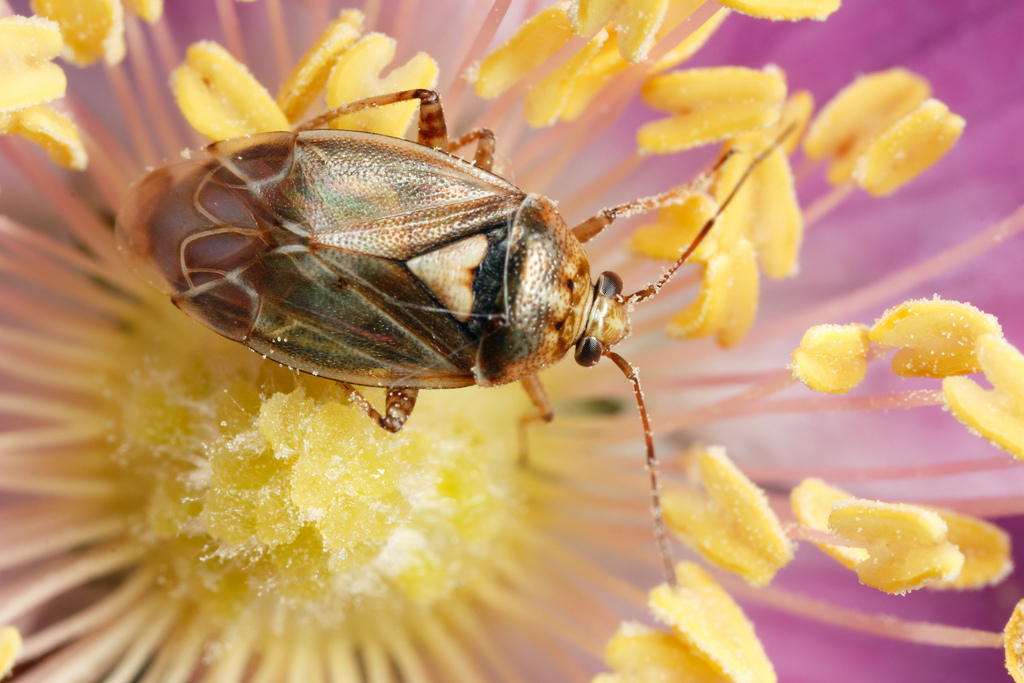

Scientific classification
- Kingdom: Animalia
- Phylum: Arthropoda
- Clade: Pancrustacea
- Class: Insecta
- Order: Hemiptera
- Suborder: Heteroptera
- Family: Miridae
- Genus: Lygus
- Species: L. lineolaris

Binomial name
- Lygus lineolaris (Palisot de Beauvois, 1818)

= Tarnished plant bug =

Species of true bug

The tarnished plant bug (TPB), Lygus lineolaris, is a species of plant-feeding insect in the family Miridae. It has piercing-sucking mouthparts and has become a serious pest on small fruits and vegetables in North America. It is considered a highly polyphagous species and feeds on over half of all commercially grown crop plants, but favors cotton, alfalfa, beans, stone fruits, and conifer seedlings. A study done in southwestern Quebec, Canada has investigated the presence of L. lineolaris in a commercial vineyard. This study also indicated that weeds that grow from cultivation of crops serve as an important food source for L. lineolaris. This insect can be found across North America, from northern Canada to southern Mexico. Adults grow up to 6.5 mm in length, and are brown with accents of yellow, orange or red, with a light-colored "V" on the back (dorsal). The genome has recently been sequenced for the first time.

== Distribution and diversity ==
Lygus lineolaris is most commonly found in the eastern half of North America. A study done to track the genetic diversity and overall distribution of L. lineolaris, specifically on host plants, in North America sampled three separate populations of L. lineolaris and marked their DNA with mitochondrial genes cytochrome oxidase 1 and cytochrome oxidase 2. The researchers wanted to examine whether the genetic differences found between L. lineolaris species were based on geographical factors. The results indicated significant differences in mtDNA among L. lineolaris species found across North America. Other evidence indicated that L. lineolaris species were found consistently on the same plant hosts but showed no specific preference for plant hosts.

The presence of L. lineolaris has been documented in vineyards in Quebec. The results of the Fleury et al. (2010) study indicated that L. lineolaris adults prefer to over-winter in apple orchards because more adults were found inside of the vineyard during winter months. In the summer months (mid-June), the adult L. lineolaris numbers decreased inside of the vineyard because of the decrease in apples and appearance of flowers. Another study observing whether geographical origin has an effect on fecundity, survivorship, hatch rate, and developmental time reported that geographical differences had no effect on the four factors.

Pollen analysis has been used as another method of measuring dispersal in L. lineolaris. Researchers used pollen grains as indicators of food sources being utilized by L. lineolaris as well as their movement between wild host plant habitats and cropping areas. The pollen grains found through analysis indicated that they were from host plants of L. lineolaris. The pollen grains further indicated that L. lineolaris spent time away from crops and instead were found on plants that were in wet or disturbed sites.

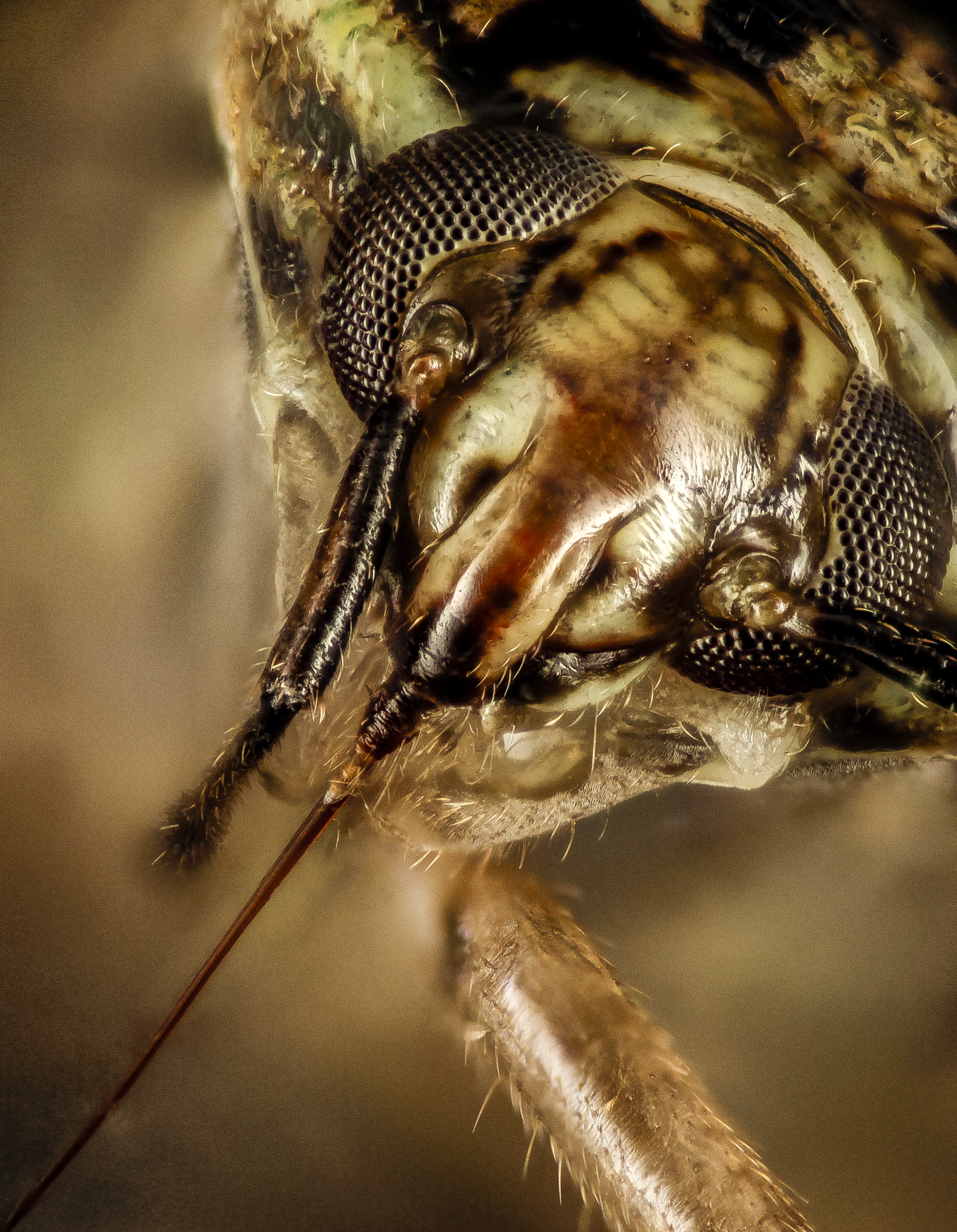
Close-up of the mouthparts of Lygus lineolaris

== Feeding ==
Although it is known to feed on almost all commercial crops, L. lineolaris specifically prefers to feed on young apples and weeds. The TPB has a special mode of feeding called the "lacerate and flush" feeding strategy where it uses sucking mouthparts to inject saliva into the host plant. The saliva of the TPB contains an enzyme called polygalacturonase which degrades plant tissue and pectin in the plant cell wall allowing for faster digestion. Researchers interested in examining other components of L. lineolaris saliva used illumina (Solexa) sequencing to discover the roles of proteins within saliva. They accomplish this via presenting a salivary gland transcriptome of the TPB. The researchers discovered TPB sialotranscriptome that played a role in extra-oral digestion.

== Reproduction ==
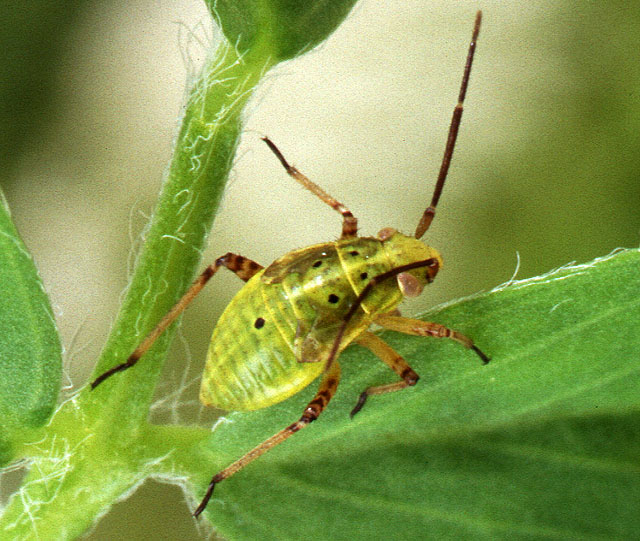
A Lygus lineolaris nymph

L. lineolaris utilize cotton plants as one of their main reproductive hosts. Females lay eggs in the first row of cotton plants and later occupy more plants in the field. The females usually lay eggs in May after the overwintering period. The eggs hatch and nymphs begin to develop around June. The highest population level of L. lineolaris is typically marked in October and June, and it is seen to also trigger a rise in the population level of Pisaurina mira, a nursery web spider that preys on L. lineolaris.

== Olfaction ==
Researchers have conducted experiments involving odourant-binding proteins (OBP) which allow for perception of odours in L. lineolaris and other insect groups. A study involved transcriptomics in order to investigate olfaction in L. lineolaris to reduce its harmful impacts on commercial crops. The transcriptomics approach indicated that there are 21 LylinOBP transcripts in the antennae, 12 in the legs and 15 in the proboscis. This further identified that these structures play an important role in insect olfaction and taste. Since the antennae are mainly responsible for direction, the presence of olfaction in the antennae can allow for recognition of different substrates. The proboscis is mainly associated with taste therefore the OBP expression in the proboscis and maxillary palp sensilla may be associated with taste in L. lineolaris.

== Vision ==
The visual system in L. lineolaris is not heavily investigated although it could provide insight into the different stimuli that allow these insects to discriminate food sources. A study investigated whether L. lineolaris adults showed distinctive visual responses to two different colours of sticky traps. The researchers decided to use pink and white sticky traps due to previous evidence indicating that pink sticky traps are the most stimulating for L. lineolaris specifically in peach orchards. L. lineolaris were attracted to pink traps as compared with white traps. L. lineolaris have the ability to discriminate colour to an extent and could even detect colour contrast. The pink colour could have provided a better contrast against the peach-coloured background thereby attracting more L. lineolaris adults.

== Capturing methods ==
There are numerous methods used to capture L. lineolaris in order to utilize these insects in scientific studies. Some studies involve capturing the TPB using traps. Researchers used white sticky traps in order to capture TPB in and around a Canadian vineyard. Compared to other methods, sticky traps have been shown to be the most effective in collecting L. lineolaris. Other traps involve using a bed sheet tied with a nylon rope around two metal poles to capture adult TPB. This method requires the use of an eppendorf tube to collect individual TPB for euthanizing purposes. Since adult L. lineolaris have been recorded to fly at about 40 to 100 cm above the ground in vineyards as well as other cultivated fruit crops, traps must be laid out at a height between 40 and 100 cm in order to capture the maximum amount of insects. Sticky traps have been proven to capture L. lineolaris most effectively.

Although traps are widely used to collect TPB, sweep nets are also effective in capturing these insects due their small size and tendency to rest on plant leaves. The sweep net method was specifically used for nymphal L. lineolaris. Another study used sweep nets to capture L. lineolaris individuals off wild host plants while also using aspirators to place them into collection containers.

== Control ==
=== Insecticides and herbicides ===
Growers routinely make 3–5 applications of insecticides each year to control this insect. Considering the narrow profit margin for today's farmers, the cost of such applications are significant. In the United States, there has been a total of 38% loss of cotton crops due to TPB population. There are approximately 4.1 insecticide applications per hectare annually in the U.S. with an estimated cost of $110 per hectare. The increasing cost for insecticides for control of TPB is due to insecticide resistance that occurs in this population due to improper time management when spraying insecticide. L. lineolaris rely on weeds growing among cultivated crops in order to overwinter therefore application of herbicides on these weeds would serve as an effective control for these insects. To control L. lineolaris population on strawberry plants, methods including insecticides have been used but recently biological controls are being implemented.

Because numerous applications of insecticides are used for annual control of L. lineolaris population, there are studies done to examine the proper time period for these applications. One such study by Wood et al. (2016) examined different planting dates in order to determine the optimal time for TPB control on cotton plants. The results obtained from the study indicated that the first four weeks of flowering were the most effective in controlling for L. lineolaris because this is when most cotton yield loss was observed. The researchers discovered through their results that it is more effective to terminate the insecticide earlier than to delay the administration of the insecticide at the beginning of the four-week period.

Neonicotinoids are a family of insecticides which cause interference and blockage of the nicotinergic pathway in the central nervous system of insects. Imidacloprid is part of the neonictinoid family and has been used to control population of L. lineolaris. Previously, a study has been conducted to examine the resistance developed by the TPB to imidacloprid. The results of the study indicated that there were changes in gene expression which was related to resistance of imidacloprid. There was an over-expression of P450 and esterase genes which the researchers connected to imidacloprid resistance by L. lineolaris.

A similar study investigating L. lineolaris from two geographical regions in terms of differing developmental time, fecundity, hatch rate, and survivorship was conducted. The researchers were interested in examining the reasons for L. lineolaris being a more influential pest in the Delta region as compared with the Hills region of the Mississippi. Although there were no differences found in the development time, fecundity, hatch rate, and survivorship of the L. lineolaris captured from the Delta and Hills regions, the researchers suggest that the larger area of the Delta region might have caused the L. lineolaris population to be subjected to more insecticides thereby having more resistance and causing more pest-related issues.

=== Biological control ===
In the mid-1980s, parasitic wasps, Peristenus digoneutis, were imported from France. Their establishment in the northeastern United States from 1984 to 2003 resulted in reduction of crop losses to the TPB of up to 63% in alfalfa and 65% in apples. The University of Vermont Entomology Laboratory studied various entomopathogenic fungi for pathogenicity against TPB. The fungus Beavaria bassiana is sometimes used to control TPB. Research has been conducted to determine the rate of parasitism by B. bassiana of L. lineolaris in strawberry and alfalfa host plants. The research, conducted in Iowa, suggested that L. lineolaris have a detrimental impact on strawberry fruits because feeding damage allows for a decrease in the market value of strawberries.

=== Physical control ===
Mowing and maintenance of weed plants can control the population of L. lineolaris adults within crop fields and vineyards. Rainfall can be classified as a form of mechanical control of L. lineolaris because rain drops may knock individuals off plants and cause a reduction in their survival. The results from a study investigating the effects of rainfall on the nymphal population of L. lineolaris indicated that the number of nymphs decreased during the heavy rainfall years. During the years with heavy rainfall, there was also less parasitism of L. lineolaris by the parasitoid wasp P. digoneutis. Due to their results that rainfall decreases L. lineolaris population, the researchers suggested that sprinkler irrigation should be used in alfalfa fields because it simulates rainfall.
