= Lygus plagiatus =

Scientific classification
- Kingdom: Animalia
- Phylum: Arthropoda
- Class: Insecta
- Order: Hemiptera
- Suborder: Heteroptera
- Family: Miridae
- Tribe: Mirini
- Genus: Lygus
- Species: L. plagiatus

Binomial name
- Lygus plagiatus Uhler, 1895

Species of true bug

Lygus plagiatus is a species of plant bug in the family Miridae. It is found in North America.
