= Lygus vanduzeei =

Scientific classification
- Kingdom: Animalia
- Phylum: Arthropoda
- Class: Insecta
- Order: Hemiptera
- Suborder: Heteroptera
- Family: Miridae
- Tribe: Mirini
- Genus: Lygus
- Species: L. vanduzeei

Binomial name
- Lygus vanduzeei Knight, 1917

Species of true bug

Lygus vanduzeei is a species of plant bug in the family Miridae. It is found in North America.
