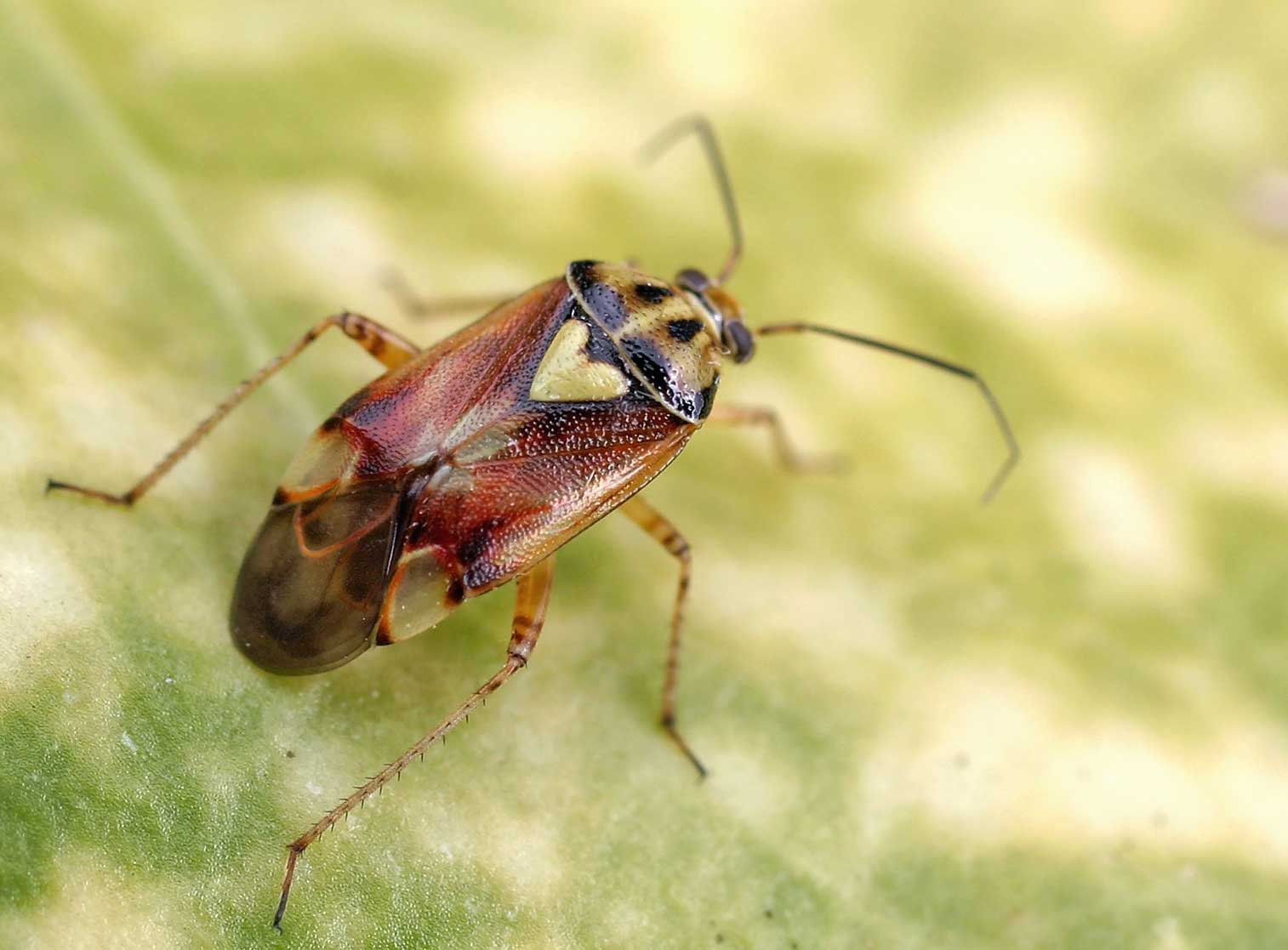
- Lygus pratensis

Scientific classification
- Domain: Eukaryota
- Kingdom: Animalia
- Phylum: Arthropoda
- Class: Insecta
- Order: Hemiptera
- Suborder: Heteroptera
- Family: Miridae
- Subfamily: Mirinae
- Tribe: Mirini
- Genus: Lygus; Hahn, 1833

= Lygus =

Genus of insects

The genus Lygus includes over 40 species of plant-feeding insects in the family Miridae. The term lygus bug is used for any member of genus Lygus.

== Species ==
At one time, nearly 200 species were classified as genus Lygus, but most of those have since been reclassified into new or existing genera. Species within this genus include:

- Lygus abroniae
- Lygus aeratus
- Lygus atriflavus
- Lygus atritibialis
- Lygus borealis
- Lygus bradleyi
- Lygus ceanothi
- Lygus convexicollis
- Lygus elisus
- Lygus gemellatus
- Lygus hesperus
- Lygus humeralis
- Lygus keltoni
- Lygus lineolaris
- Lygus lupini
- Lygus maritimus
- Lygus mexicanus
- Lygus oregonae
- Lygus perplexus
- Lygus plagiatus
- Lygus potentillae
- Lygus pratensis
- Lygus punctatus
- Lygus robustus
- Lygus rolfsi
- Lygus rubroclarus
- Lygus rubrosignatus
- Lygus rufidorsus
- Lygus rugulipennis
- Lygus scudderi
- Lygus shulli
- Lygus solidaginis
- Lygus striatus
- Lygus unctuosus
- Lygus wagneri
- Lygus vanduzeei
- Lygus varius
- The tarnished plant bug (Lygus lineolaris) feeds on over half of all commercially grown crop plants, but favors cotton, alfalfa, beans, stone fruits, and conifer seedlings. This bug can be found across North America, from northern Canada to southern Mexico.
- The western tarnished plant bug (Lygus hesperus) is a very serious pest of cotton, strawberries, and seed crops such as alfalfa.
- The European tarnished plant bug (Lygus rugulipennis) is distributed throughout Europe, where it will feed on over 400 types of crop plant from peach trees to wheat to lettuce.

== Description ==
These insects appear as small oval creatures. Adult lygus are approximately 3 mm wide and 6 mm long, colored anything in a range from pale green to reddish brown or black. The bugs can be solid shaded or mottled, and have a distinctive triangle or V-shape on their backs. Adults are capable of flight, and will often thus escape when approached. Nymphs are wingless, and being light green in color, are often mistaken for aphids. However, lygus nymphs have harder exoskeletons, are typically more active, gain spots as they age, and lack aphid cornicles.[7]

== Biology ==
Lygus bugs are known for their destructive feeding habits - they puncture plant tissues with their piercing mouthparts, and feed by sucking sap. Both the physical injury and the plant's own reaction to the bugs' saliva cause damage to the plant. The females insert their eggs directly into the plant tissues using piercing ovipositors, and the newly emerged nymphs are voracious consumers of plant tissue juices. Signs that a plant has been attacked by lygus bugs include discoloration, deformation of shoots and stems, curling of leaves, and lesions on the plant tissues.

== Economic importance ==
The more well-known lygus bugs are those that have agricultural impacts. Some lygus bugs are very serious agricultural pests.

Some methods of biological pest control have proved useful against lygus bugs. For example, wasps of the genus Peristenus are parasitoids of lygus bugs; an adult wasp will inject an egg into a lygus nymph, and once the egg hatches the wasp's larva will consume the nymph from the inside out.

== Gallery ==
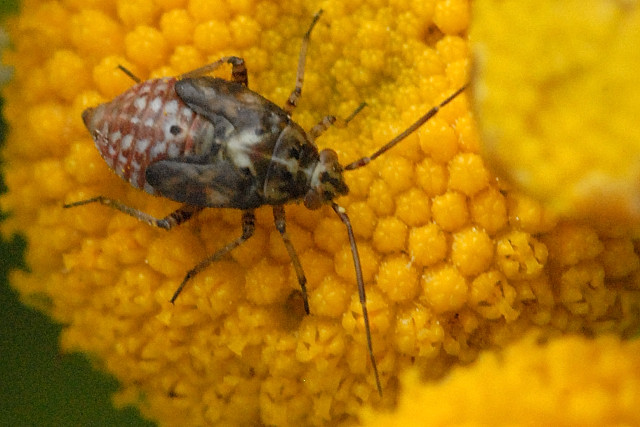

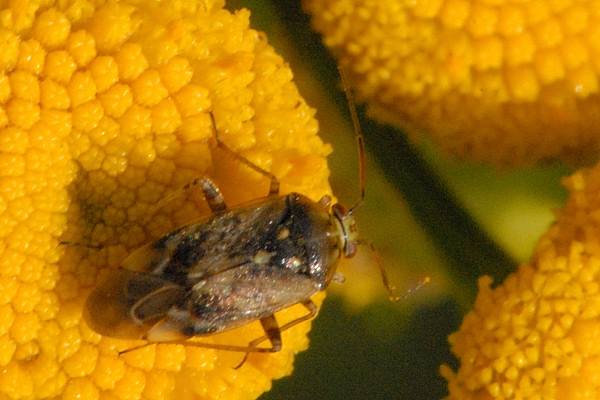

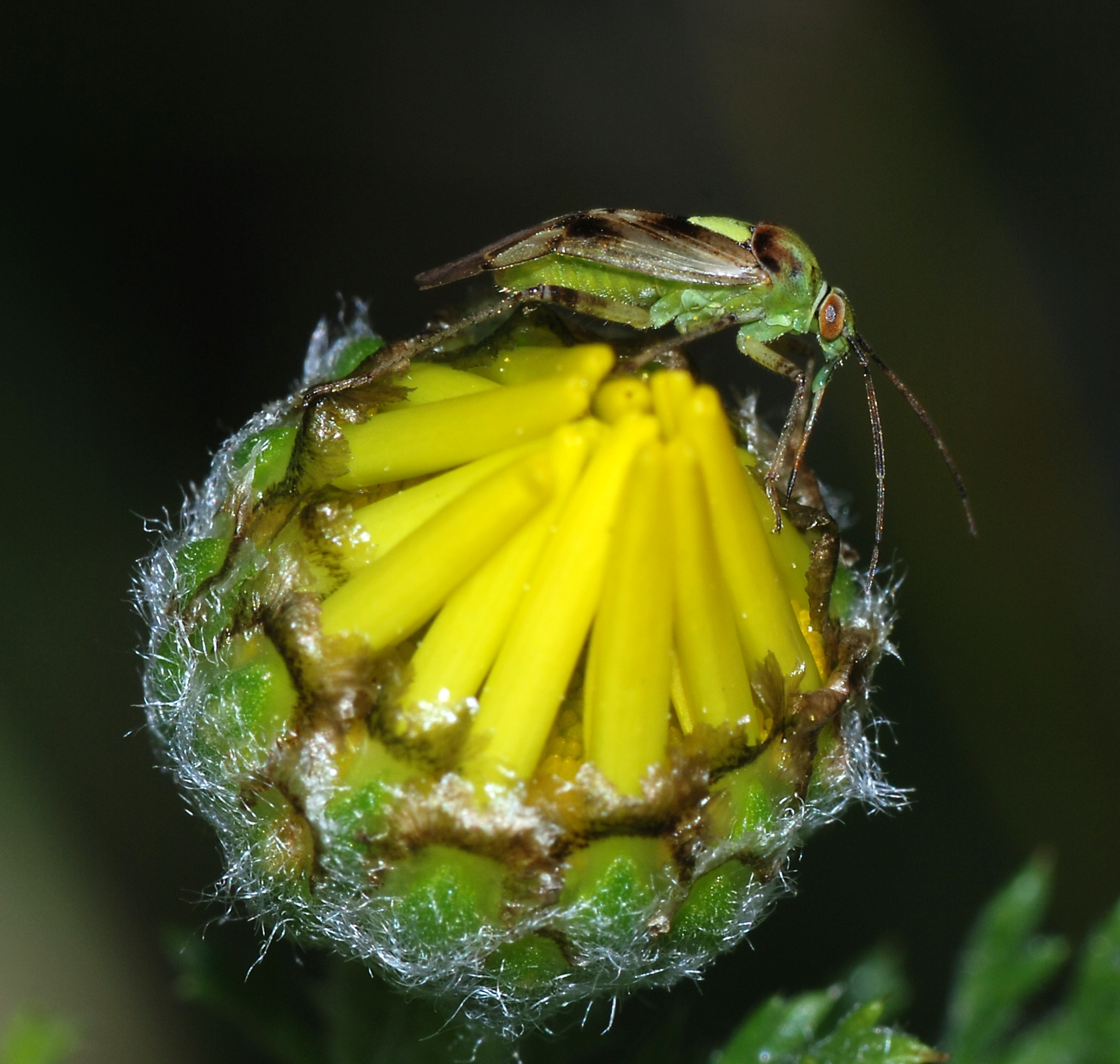

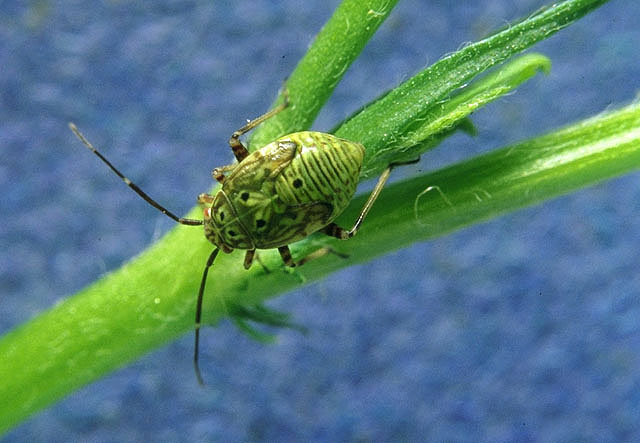

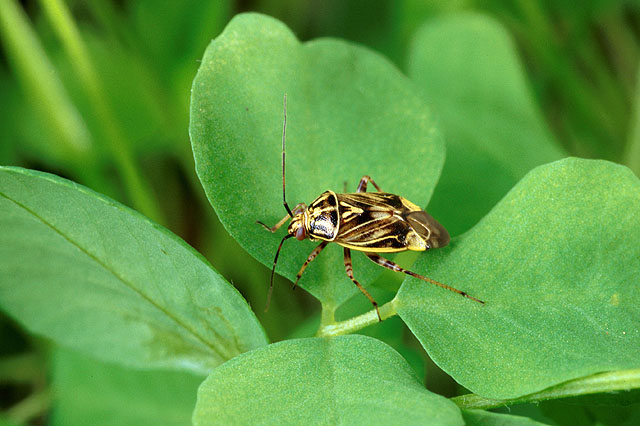

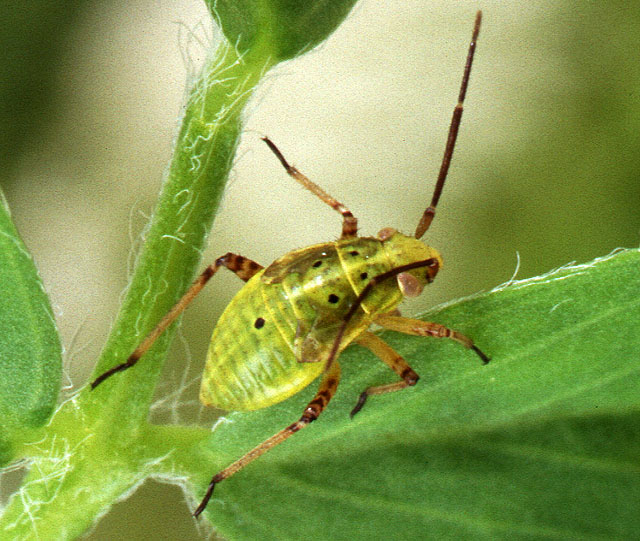
