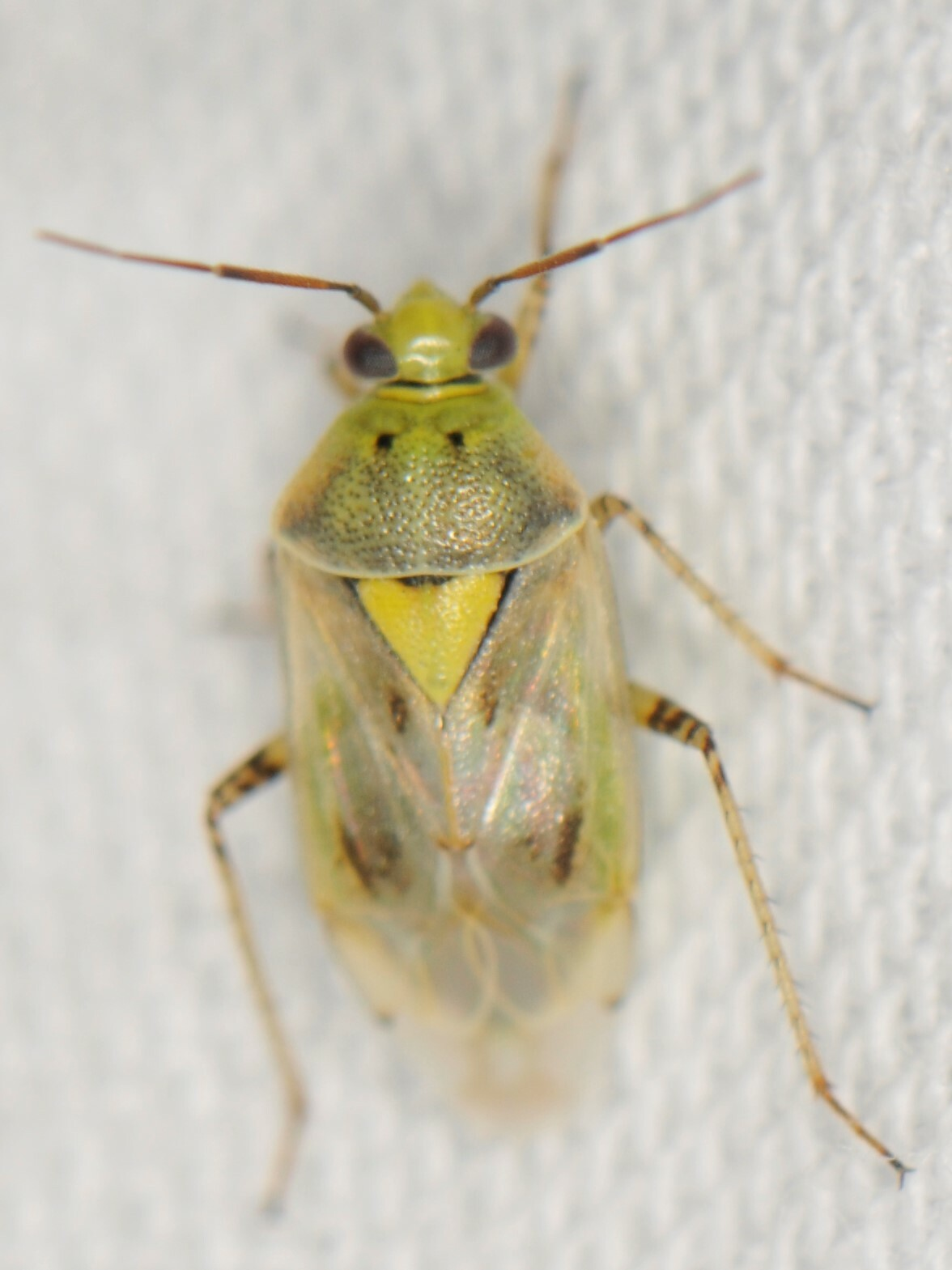

Scientific classification
- Kingdom: Animalia
- Phylum: Arthropoda
- Class: Insecta
- Order: Hemiptera
- Suborder: Heteroptera
- Family: Miridae
- Tribe: Mirini
- Genus: Lygus
- Species: L. elisus

Binomial name
- Lygus elisus Van Duzee, 1914

Synonyms
- Lygus desertus Knight, 1944

= Lygus elisus =

Species of true bug

Lygus elisus, known generally as the pale legume bug or lucerne plant bug, is a species of plant bug in the family Miridae. It is found in Central America, North America, and Oceania.
