= Lygus unctuosus =

Scientific classification
- Kingdom: Animalia
- Phylum: Arthropoda
- Class: Insecta
- Order: Hemiptera
- Suborder: Heteroptera
- Family: Miridae
- Tribe: Mirini
- Genus: Lygus
- Species: L. unctuosus

Binomial name
- Lygus unctuosus (Kelton, 1955)

Species of true bug

Lygus unctuosus is a species of plant bug in the family Miridae. It is found in North America.
