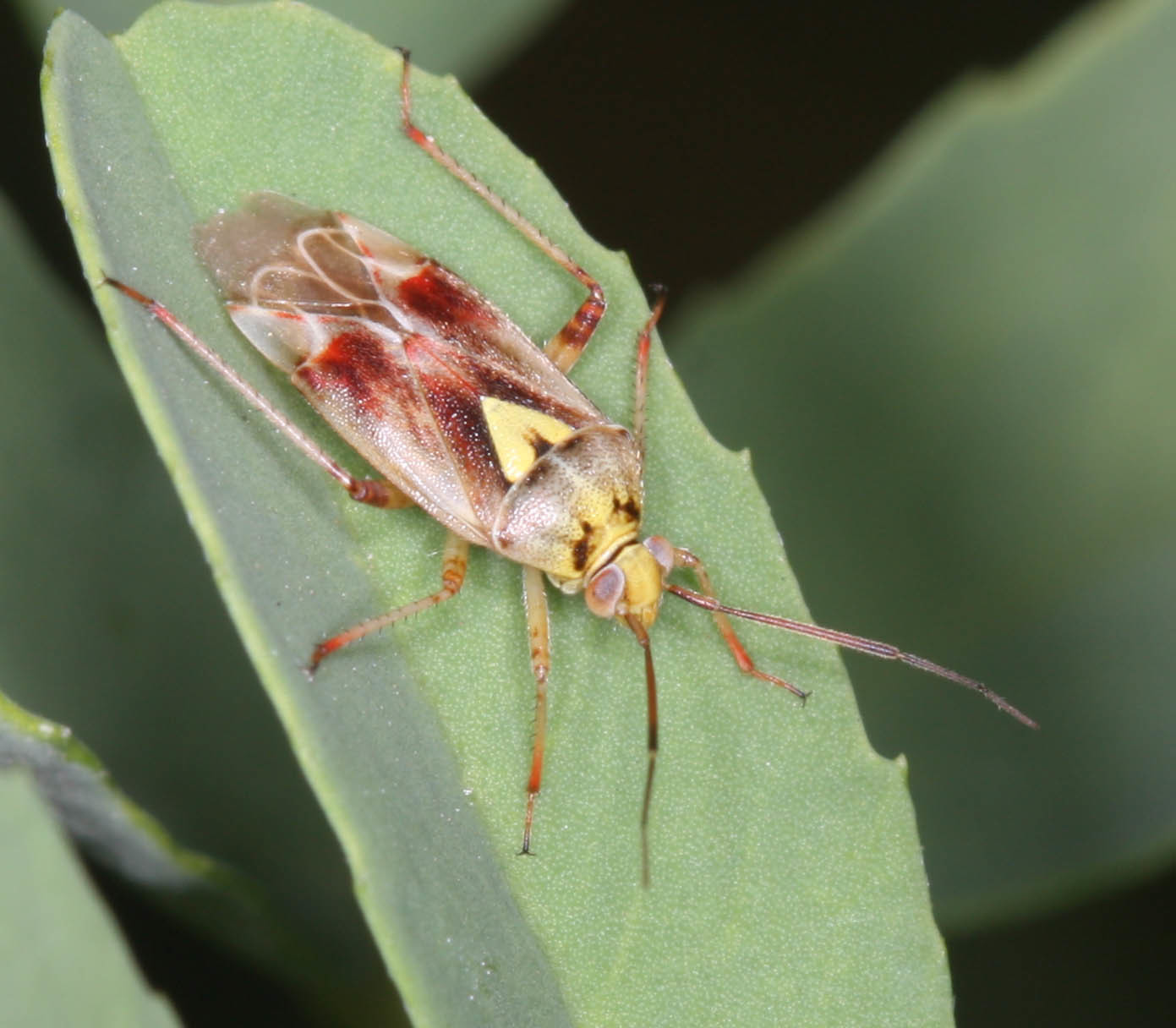

Scientific classification
- Kingdom: Animalia
- Phylum: Arthropoda
- Class: Insecta
- Order: Hemiptera
- Suborder: Heteroptera
- Family: Miridae
- Genus: Lygus
- Species: L. hesperus

Binomial name
- Lygus hesperus (Knight, 1917)

= Lygus hesperus =

Species of true bug

Lygus hesperus, the western tarnished plant bug, is a serious pest of cotton, strawberries, and seed crops such as alfalfa. In the state of California alone the bug causes US$30 million in damage to cotton plants each year, and at least US$40 million in losses to the state's strawberry industry.

== Hosts ==
Strawberry in California. See also Western Tarnished Plant Bug in California.
