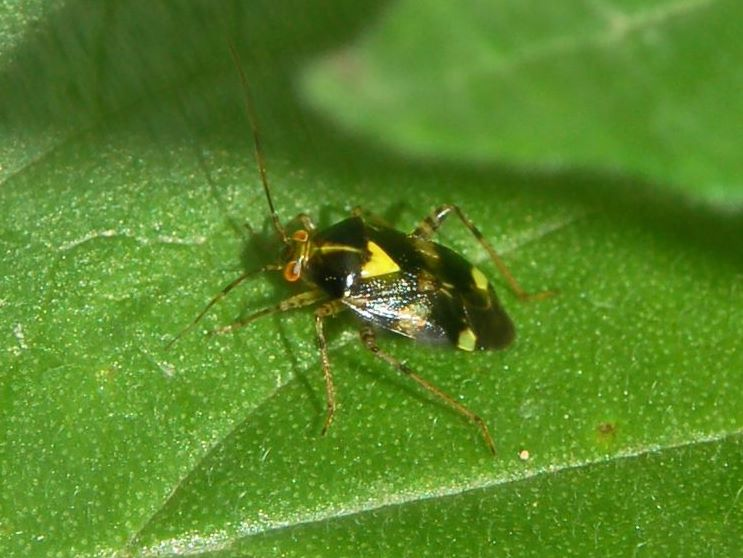
- Adult

Scientific classification
- Kingdom: Animalia
- Phylum: Arthropoda
- Class: Insecta
- Order: Hemiptera
- Suborder: Heteroptera
- Family: Miridae
- Genus: Liocoris
- Species: L. tripustulatus

Binomial name
- Liocoris tripustulatus (Fabricius, 1781)

Synonyms
- List: Cimex bifasciatus Muller, 1764; Cimex tripustulatus Fabricius, 1781; Liocoris autumnalis Reuter 1875; Liocoris bifasciatus (Muller, 1764); Liocoris bimaculatus Stichel 1930; Liocoris inequalis Stichel 1930; Liocoris lhesgica Kolenati 1845; Liocoris mutatus Stichel 1930; Liocoris nepeticolus Reuter, 1896; Liocoris pallens Noualhier 1895; Liocoris pictus (Hahn 1833); Liocoris quadrimaculatus Stichel 1930; Liocoris signatus Poppius 1912; Liocoris similis Stichel 1958; Liocoris sordidus Stichel 1958; Liocoris tibialis Lindberg 1930; Lygus tibialis (Lindberg, 1930); Phytocoris pictus Hahn 1833; Phytocoris tripustulatus (Fabricius, 1781)

= Liocoris tripustulatus =

Species of true bug

Liocoris tripustulatus or the common nettle bug is a species of plant bug belonging to the family Miridae, subfamily Mirinae. The species was first described by Johan Christian Fabricius in 1781.

== Distribution ==
This species can be found in most of Europe.

== Habitat ==
These plant bugs are generally found on low vegetation.

== Description ==
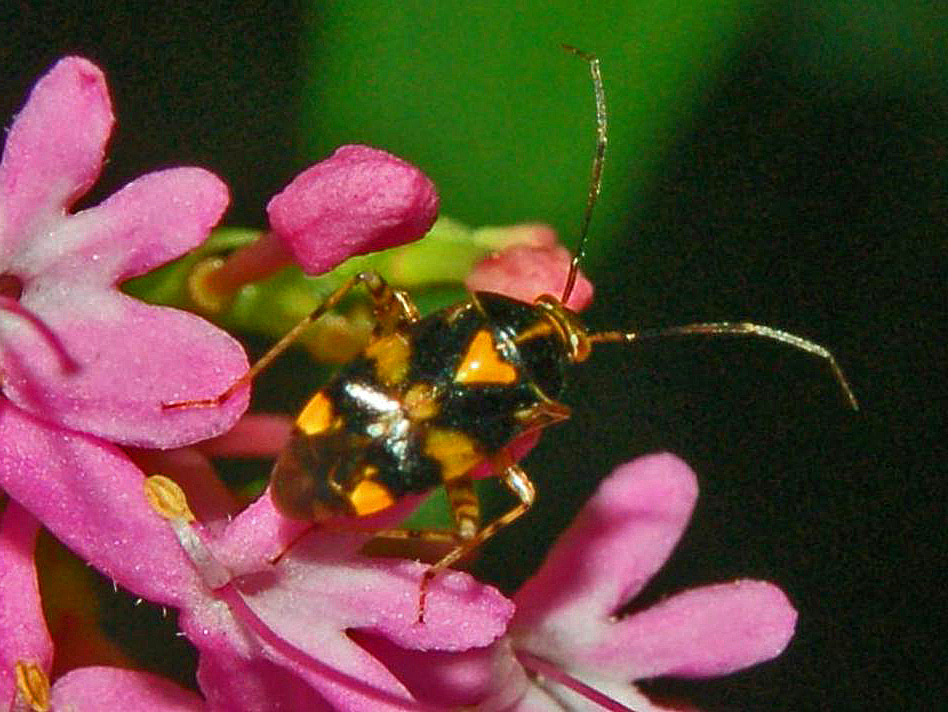
Liocoris tripustulatus

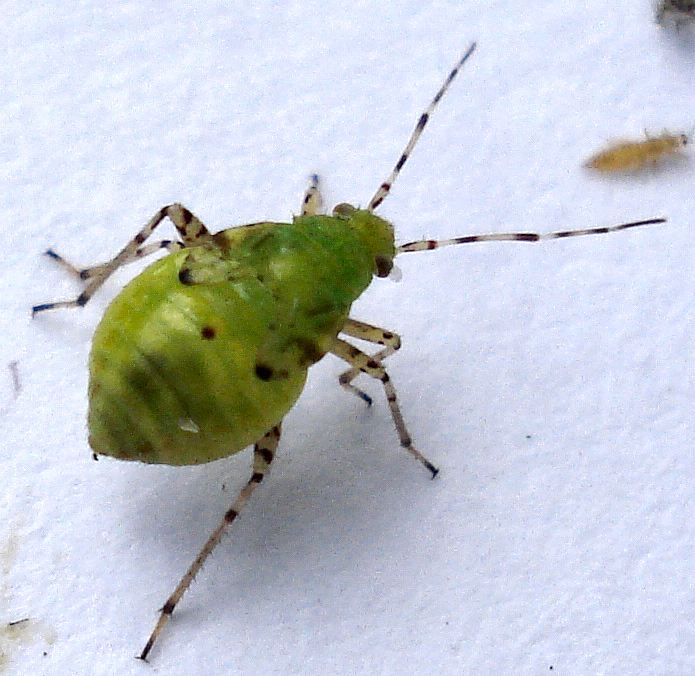
Nymph

Adults are normally 4 to 5 mm long, darker brown with cream-coloured to yellow highlights. The scutellum shows a heart shaped marking, while in the wings there are two spots. Across the body is present a more or less visible clear band. This species is quite variable in colour. In springs the basic colour is darker, while the cuneus is bright orange-yellow. The new generation of adults is commonly paler and markings are less pronounced. Head width is about 1/2 of the width of the pronotum. Legs are pale yellowish, striped with black rings. Tibiae show short dark spines.

== Biology ==
Adults can be found all year. Following mating, females may survive until mid-summer, when the adults of the new generation appear. The primary food of these bugs in all stages of development is nettles.

== Bibliography ==
- Hudec K., Kolibáč J., Laštůvka Z., Peňáz M. a kol. (2007): Příroda České republiky: průvodce faunou, Academia
- Kerzhner I. M.; Josifov M. (1999). "Family Miridae". In Aukema, Berend; Rieger, Christian. Catalogue of the Heteroptera of the Palaearctic Region. 3, Cimicomorpha II. Amsterdam: Netherlands Entomological Society. pp. 1–577, pages 108 & 109. ISBN 978-90-71912-19-1.
- Kment P. (2013) - Preliminary check-list of the Heteroptera of Czech Republic
- Schwartz, Michael D. & Foottit, Robert G. (1998). Revision of the Nearctic species of the genus Lygus Hahn, with a review of the Palearctic species (Heteroptera: Miridae). Memoirs of Entomology International number 10. Gainesville, Florida: Associated Publishers. ISBN 978-1-56665-066-3.
