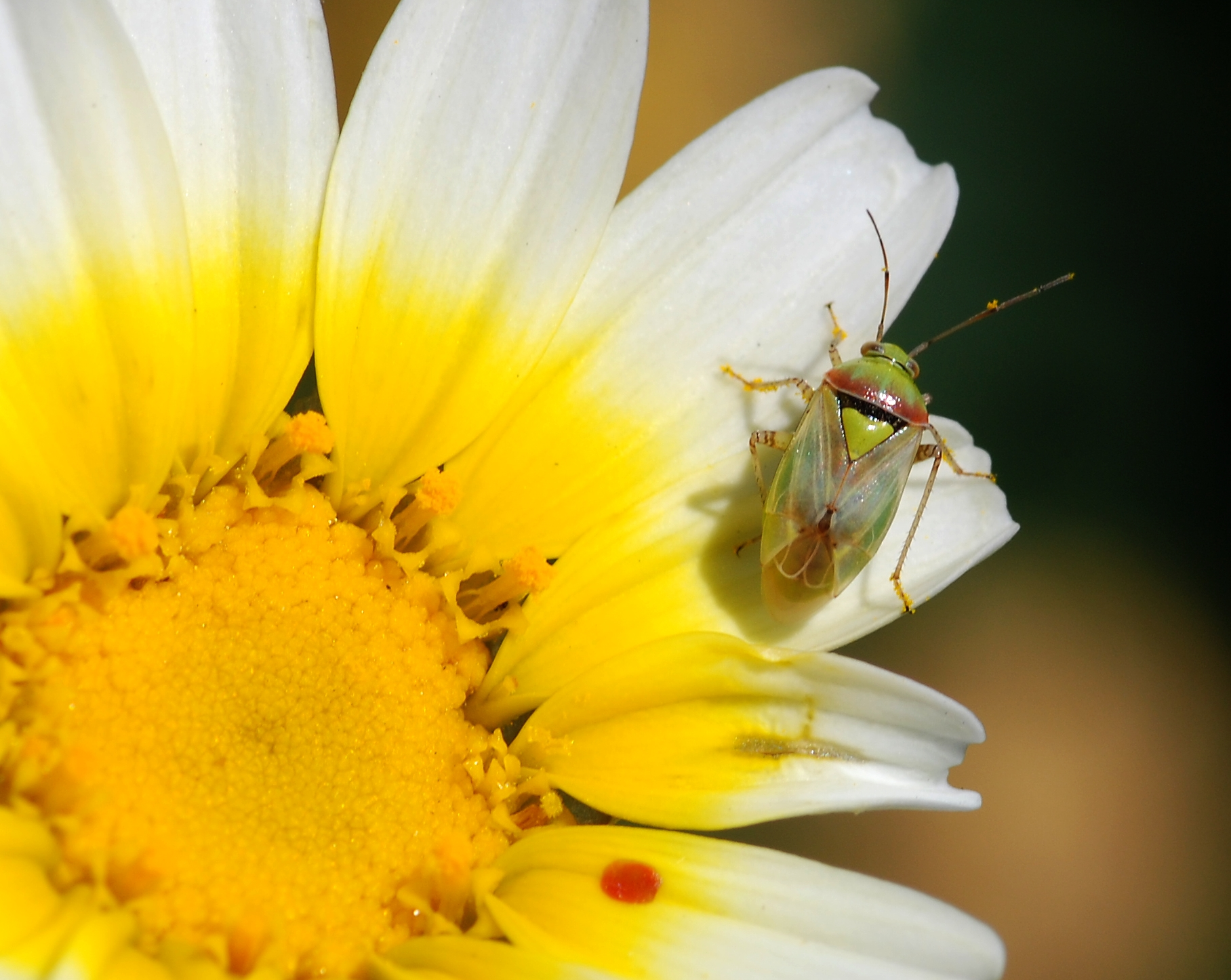
- Lygus maritimus Portugal

Scientific classification
- Kingdom: Animalia
- Phylum: Arthropoda
- Class: Insecta
- Order: Hemiptera
- Suborder: Heteroptera
- Family: Miridae
- Genus: Lygus
- Species: L. maritimus

Binomial name
- Lygus maritimus Wagner 1949

= Lygus maritimus =

Species of true bug

Heterocordylus tibialis is a Palearctic species of true bug.
