= Corium (entomology) =

Thickened, leathery, basal portion of an insect forewing

Wing of a pentatomid, showing corium

The corium is the thickened, leathery, basal portion of the forewing or hemelytron of an insect in the order Hemiptera, suborder Heteroptera. Specifically, the large anterior portion of the basal region is the corium.

== Hemelytra ==
The forewings of winged heteropterans are modified into hemelytra (singular, hemelytron), in which the basal part is thickened and leathery and the apical part is membranous. The thickened region is divided into a large, anterior corium and much smaller, posterior clavus. However, entomologists commonly refer to the whole basal region of the wing as the corium.

The membranous apical region typically has veins and the venation is of taxonomic importance. However, in some families, the distinction between the leathery and membranous regions of the hemelytra is not pronounced, and the wings tend to be more fully sclerotized (e.g., Pleidae) or more fully membranous (e.g., winged Gerridae). The hind wings are fully membranous and held beneath the hemelytra when at rest. In some groups, especially among aquatic heteropterans, adults of the same species, or different species in the same genus, may be fully-winged or brachypterous, micropterous, or apterous (having reduced wings or none at all).
